= World Jewish Congress =

International federation

- Formation: August 1936; 90 years ago
- Type: 501(c)(3) organization
- Headquarters: New York City, United States
- Region served: Worldwide
- President: Ronald S. Lauder
- Key people: David de Rothschild, Chairman of the Governing Board; Charlotte Knobloch, Vice President; Raya Kalenova, Treasurer
- Main organ: Plenary Assembly
- Website: www.worldjewishcongress.org

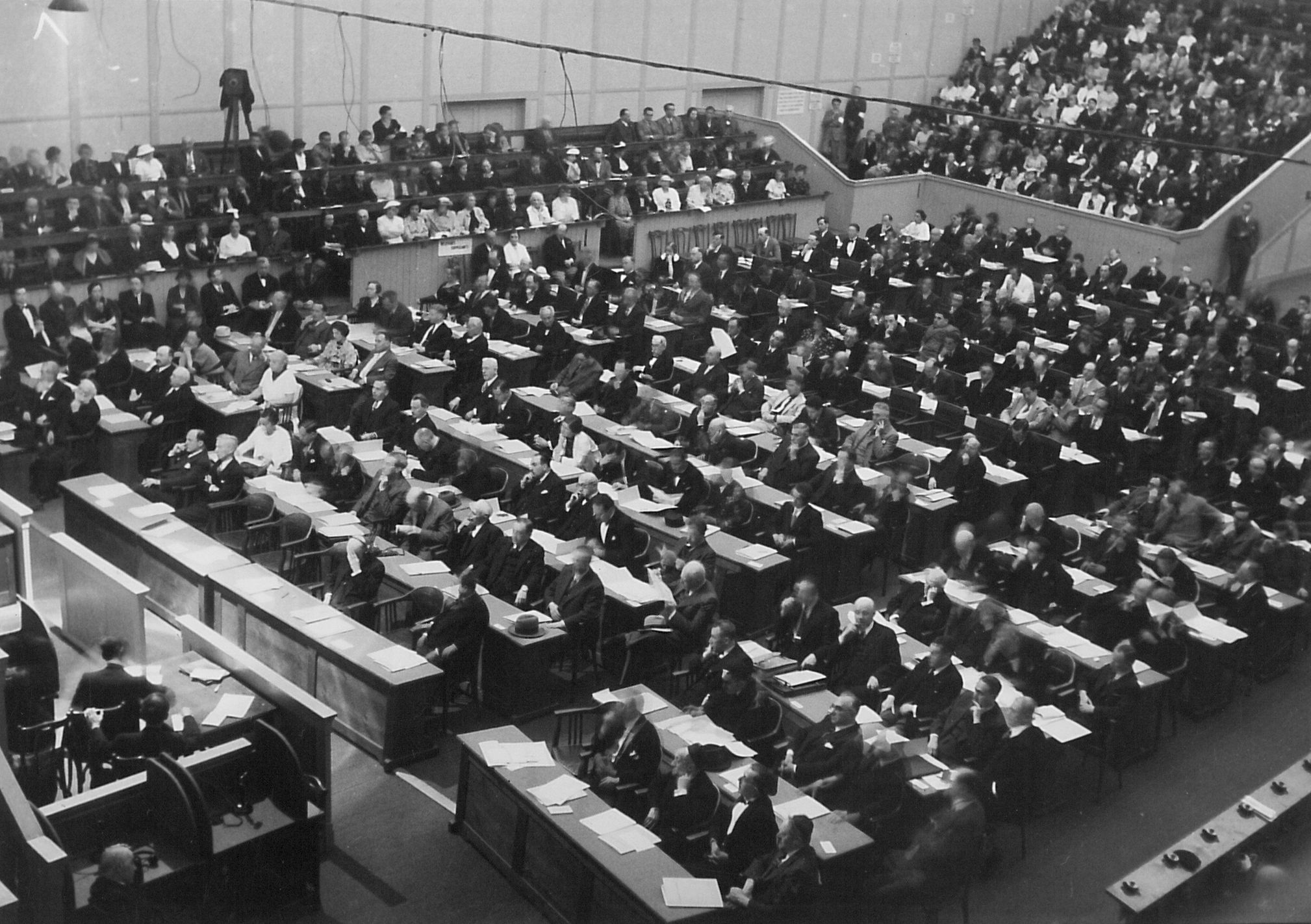
World Jewish Congress in Geneva, Switzerland, 1953

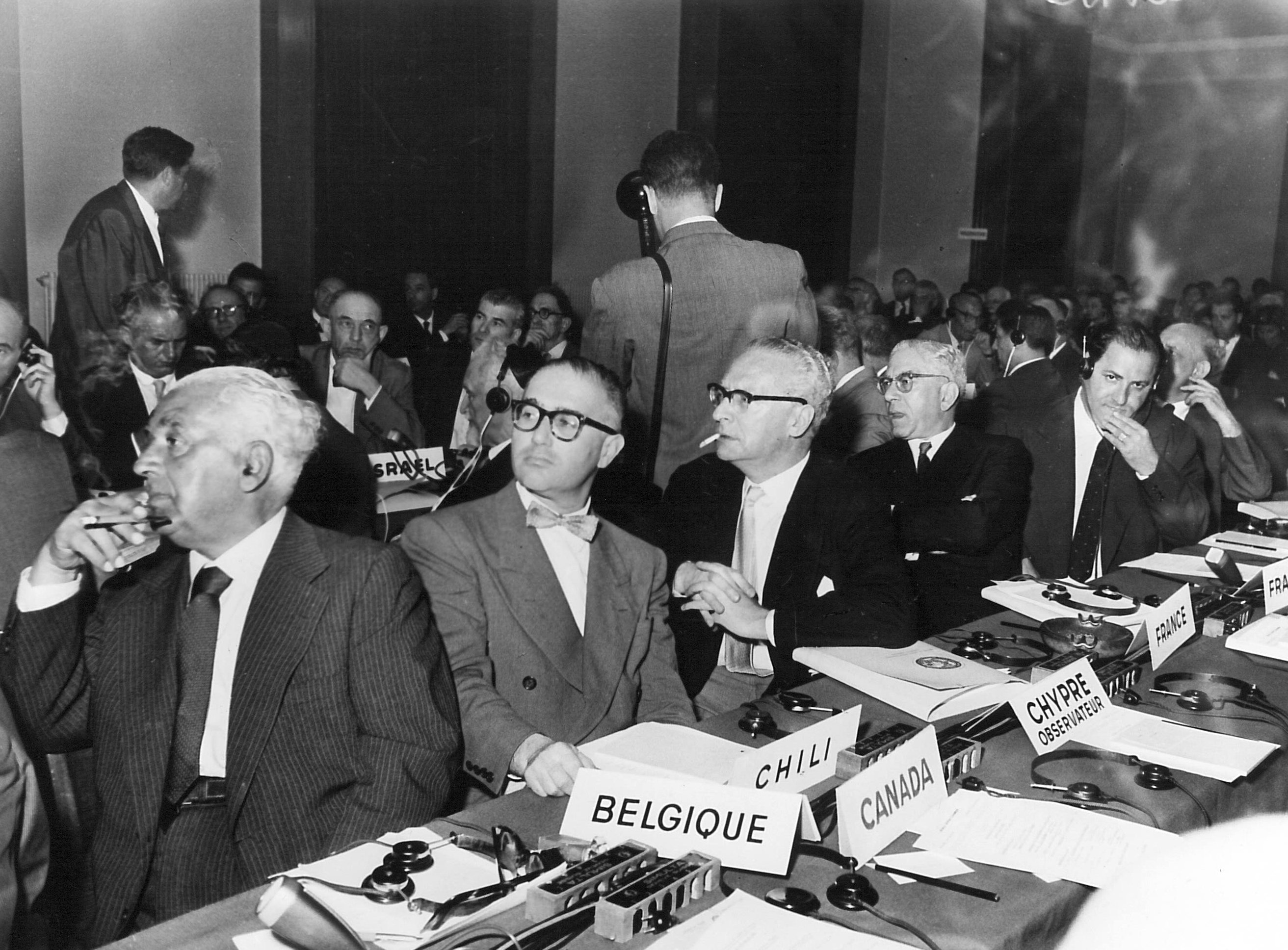
Delegates at World Jewish Congress 25th Anniversary Conference, Geneva, Switzerland, 1961

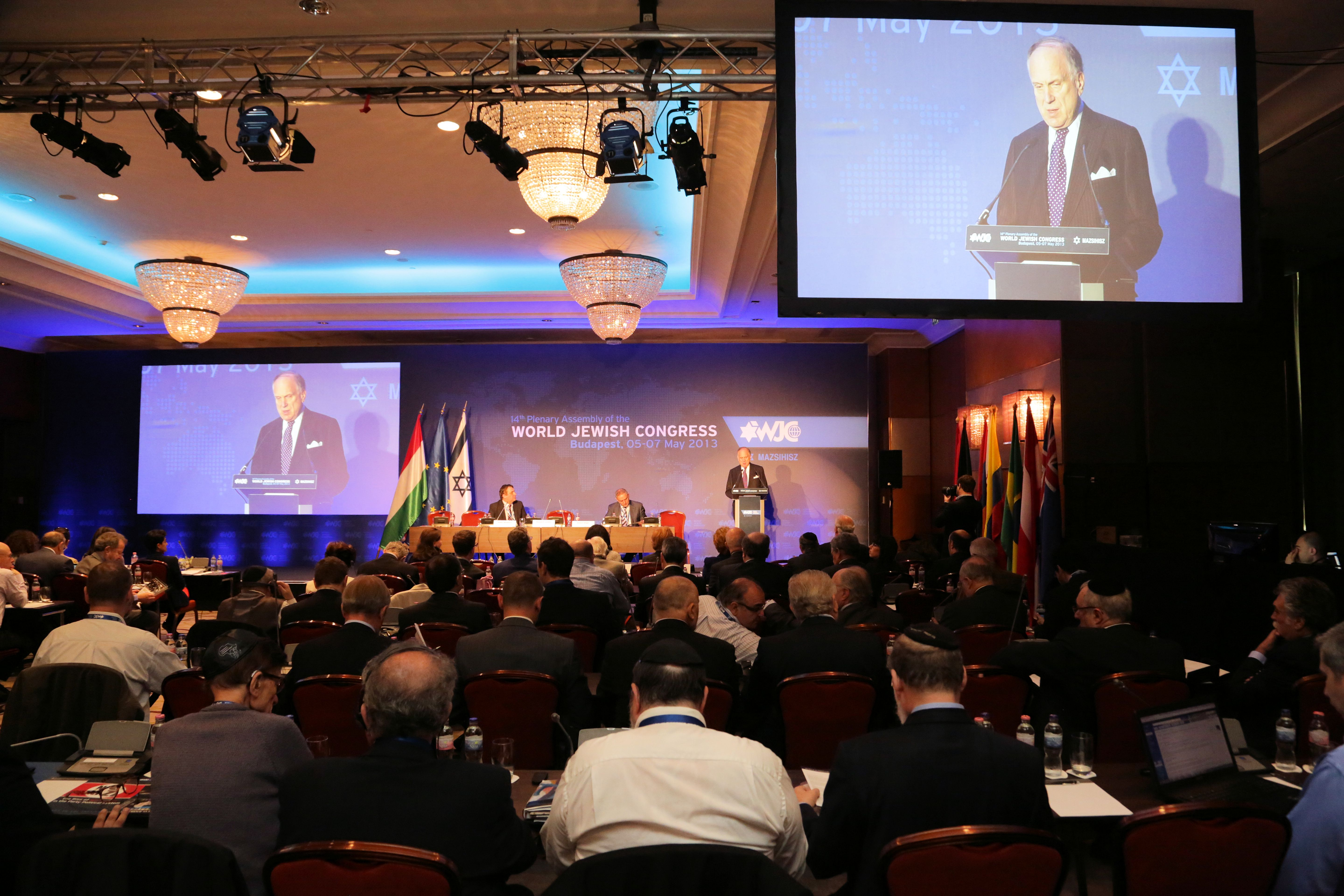
World Jewish Congress President Ronald S. Lauder addressing the 14th Plenary Assembly of the World Jewish Congress in Budapest, Hungary, 7 May 2013

The World Jewish Congress (WJC) is an international federation of Jewish communities and organizations, founded in Geneva, Switzerland, in August 1936. According to its mission statement, the World Jewish Congress's main purpose is to act as "the diplomatic arm of the Jewish people". Membership in the WJC is open to all representative Jewish groups or communities, irrespective of the social, political or economic ideology of the community's host country. The World Jewish Congress headquarters are in New York City, and the organization maintains international offices in Brussels, Belgium; Jerusalem; Paris, France; Moscow, Russia; Buenos Aires, Argentina; and Geneva, Switzerland. The WJC has special consultative status with the United Nations Economic and Social Council.

== History ==
The World Jewish Congress was established in Geneva, Switzerland, in August 1936 in reaction to the rise of Nazism and the growing wave of European antisemitism. Since its founding, it has been a permanent body with offices around the world. The main aims of the organization were "to mobilize the Jewish people and the democratic forces against the Nazi onslaught", to "fight for equal political and economic rights everywhere, and particularly for the Jewish minorities in Central and Eastern Europe", to support the establishment of a "Jewish National Home in Palestine" and to create "a worldwide Jewish representative body based on the concept of the unity of the Jewish people, democratically organized and able to act on matters of common concern".

=== Precursor organizations (1917–1936) ===
The WJC's precursor organizations were the American Jewish Congress and the Comité des Délégations Juives (Committee of Jewish Delegations). The latter was established in March 1919 to represent Jewish communities at the Paris Peace Conference, and advocated for Jewish minority rights in various countries, including the negotiation of rights for Jews in Turkey in the Treaty of Sèvres (1920) and special agreements with smaller eastern European states. Headed by Russian Zionist Leo Motzkin, the Comité des Délégations Juives was composed of delegations from Palestine, the United States, Canada, Russia, Ukraine, Poland, East Galicia, Romania, Transylvania, Bukovina, Czechoslovakia, Italy, Yugoslavia, and Greece, and funded mainly by the World Zionist Organization.

However, the first impetus for the creation of the WJC came from the American Jewish Congress. In December 1917, the AJC adopted a resolution calling for the "convening of a World Jewish Congress", "as soon as peace is declared among the warring nations" in Europe. In 1923, Motzkin visited the United States and addressed the AJC Executive Committee, "pleading for a World Conference of Jews to discuss the conditions of Jews in various lands and to devise ways and means for effective protection of Jewish rights". Conferences co-organized by Motzkin and the AJC leaders Julian Mack and Stephen Wise took place in 1926 in London and in 1927 in Zurich, Switzerland. The latter was attended by 65 Jews from 13 countries, representing 43 Jewish organizations, though the main Jewish groups in Belgium, Britain, France, Germany, Italy and the Netherlands, as well as the American Jewish Committee, declined the invitation to attend.

The First Preparatory World Jewish Conference was held in Geneva in August 1932. A preparatory committee was headed by Zionist Nahum Goldmann, who was one of the leading advocates of the establishment of an international Jewish representative body. Goldmann defined the purpose of the World Jewish Congress as follows:

It is to establish the permanent address of the Jewish people; amidst the fragmentation and atomization of Jewish life and of the Jewish community; it is to establish a real, legitimate, collective representation of Jewry which will be entitled to speak in the name of the 16 million Jews to the nations and governments of the world, as well as to the Jews themselves.

The conference approved plans to set up the new organization in 1934, with headquarters in New York and European offices in Berlin, Germany. In a manifesto, delegates called upon the Jewish people to unite as the only effective means of averting danger. The Jews, the declaration said, had to rely on their own power with the assistance of such enlightened sections of the world which had not yet been saturated with poisonous antisemitism. It added: "The World Jewish Congress does not aim at weakening any existing organizations, but rather to support and stimulate them." The new organization would be based on the "concept of the Jewish people as a national entity, and authorized and obligated to deal with all problems affecting Jewish life".

In the summer of 1933, following the rise to power of Adolf Hitler and his NSDAP in Germany, American Jewish Congress President Bernard Deutsch called on US Jewish organizations to support the establishment of a World Jewish Congress "to prove the sincerity of their stand" in favor of the embattled Jews of Germany.

=== Founding (1936) ===
After two more preparatory conferences in 1933 and 1934, the First Plenary Assembly, held in Geneva in August 1936, established the World Jewish Congress as a permanent and democratic organization. Elections for delegates to that assembly had to be according to democratic principles, namely secret, direct, and based on proportional representation. The 52 American delegates, for instance, were chosen at an Electoral Convention which met in Washington, DC, on 13/14 June 1936 and which was attended by 1,000 representatives from 99 communities in 32 US states.

The World Jewish Congress's expressed goal was Jewish unity and the strengthening of Jewish political influence to assure the survival of the Jewish people and promote the establishment of a Jewish state. 230 delegates representing 32 countries gathered for the first WJC assembly. Addressing a press conference in Geneva, Stephen S. Wise assailed German Jews for opposing the WJC. He said: "I must make clear that the congress is not a parliament nor an attempt at a parliament. It is nothing more than an assembly of representatives of those Jewries which choose to associate themselves in defense of Jewish rights. The congress will not be wholly representative until all Jews choose to be represented by it."

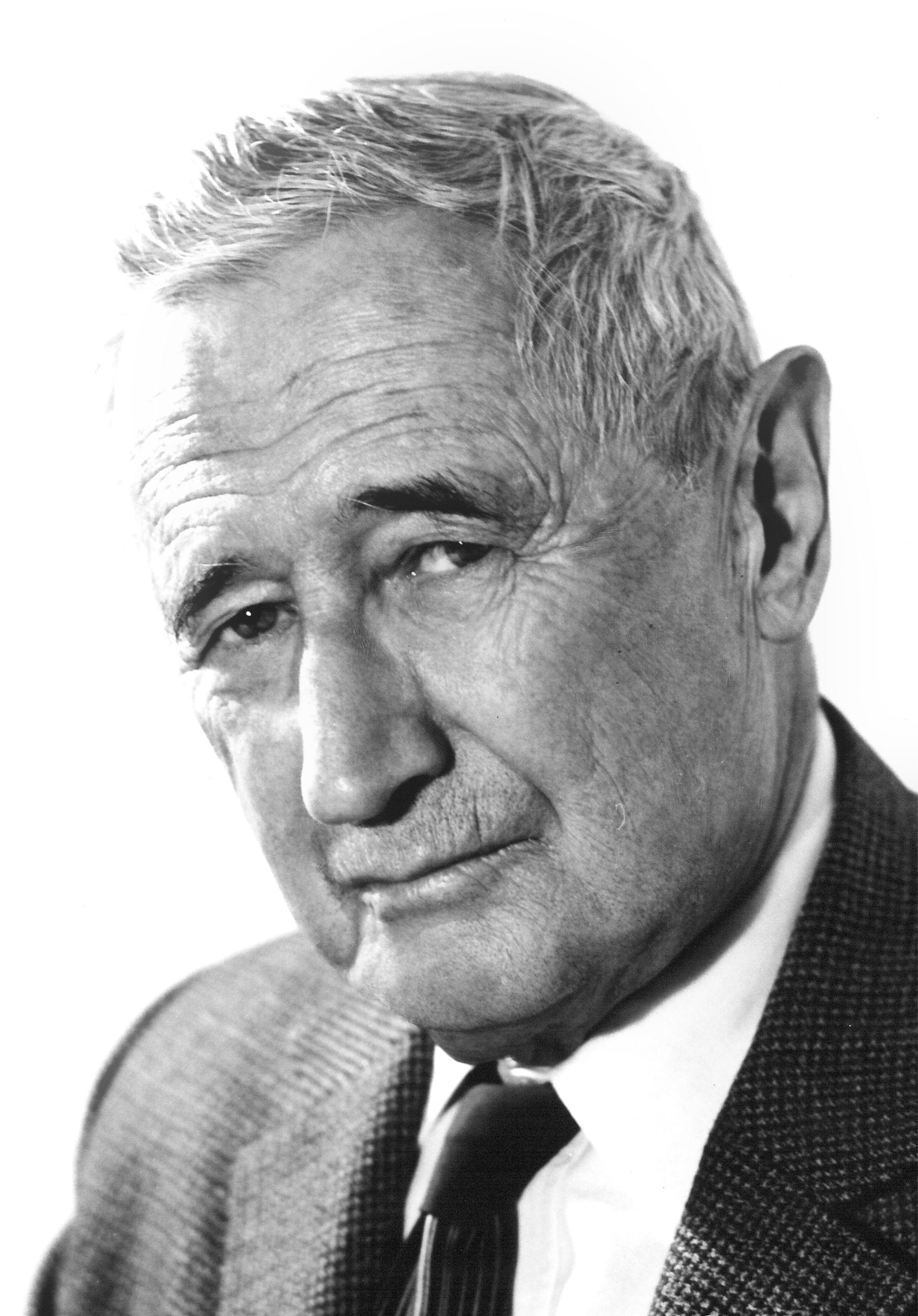
Nahum Goldmann, co-founder and president of the World Jewish Congress from 1949 to 1977

Although the delegates elected the US federal judge and erstwhile president of the American Jewish Congress Julian Mack as honorary president of the WJC, Wise was appointed as chairman of the WJC Executive and thus de facto leader of the congress. Nahum Goldmann was named chair of the Administrative Committee. The WJC Executive immediately drew up a declaration urging the British government not to halt immigration to Palestine which was presented to British diplomats in Bern, Switzerland.

The WJC chose Paris as its headquarters with a liaison office to the League of Nations in Geneva, first headed by the Swiss international lawyer and WJC Legal Advisor Paul Guggenheim and later by Gerhart Riegner, who initially served as Guggenheim's secretary.

In its fight against growing antisemitism in Europe, the WJC pursued a two-pronged approach: the political and legal sphere (mainly lobbying of the League of Nations and public statements) and organizing a boycott of products from Nazi Germany. Given the weakness of the League of Nations vis-à-vis Germany and the successful efforts by the Nazi regime to stave off an economic boycott, neither approach proved very effective.

Following the November 1938 Kristallnacht pogroms against Jews in Germany in which at least 91 Jews were killed and many synagogues and Jewish shops were destroyed, the WJC issued a statement: "Though the Congress deplores the fatal shooting of an official of the German Embassy in Paris by a young Polish Jew of seventeen, it is obliged to protest energetically against the violent attacks in the German press against the whole of Judaism because of this act and, especially, to protest against the reprisals taken against the German Jews after the crime."

With the outbreak of World War II in September 1939, the WJC moved to Geneva to facilitate communications with Jewish communities in Europe. In the summer of 1940, by which time most of Europe had fallen under Nazi occupation, the headquarters were moved to New York to share office space with the American Jewish Congress, and a special WJC office was set up in London. The British Section of the WJC was tasked with acting as the European representative of the organization.

Some of the personnel who worked in the WJC's European offices immigrated to the United States when the WJC moved its headquarters there. At the New York office in the 1940s, the major departments were: Political Department, Institute of Jewish Affairs (research and legal work), Relief and Rescue, Department for Culture and Education (or Culture Department), and Organization Department. In 1940, the WJC opened a representative office in Buenos Aires, Argentina.

=== The Holocaust and its aftermath ===
The WJC's initial priorities included safeguarding Jewish minority rights, combating anti-Semitism in Europe, and providing emergency relief to Jews fleeing Nazi persecution. The WJC also concentrated on security for Jewish refugees and victims of the war. In 1939, the World Jewish Congress set up a relief committee for Jewish war refugees (RELICO) and cooperated with the International Committee of the Red Cross to protect Jews in Nazi-occupied countries.

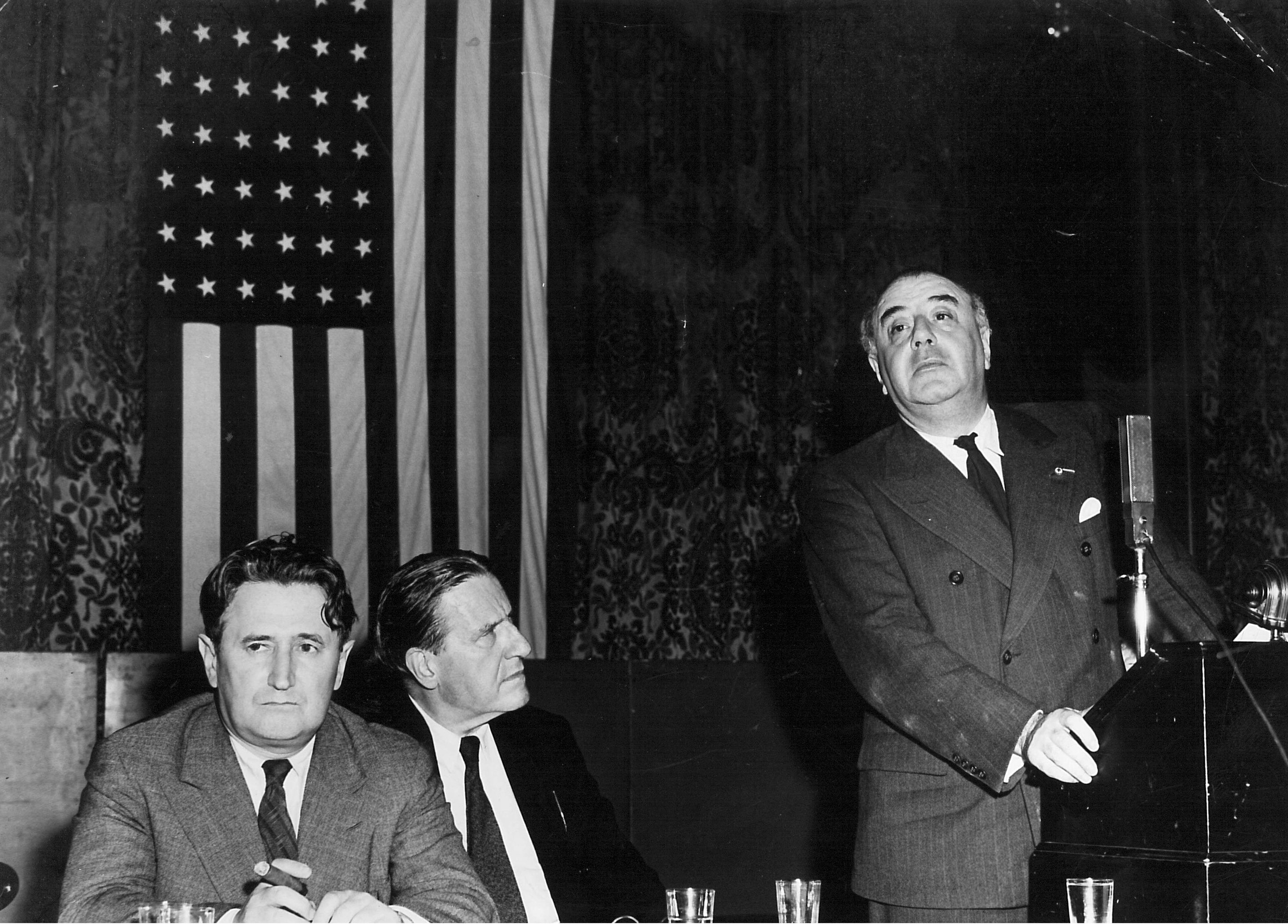
Left to right: Nahum Goldmann, Stephen Wise, and French lawyer Henry Torrès (speaking) at a World Jewish Congress conference in New York City, 7 June 1942

Under the auspices of the WJC, 18 committees were set up in the United States composed of exiled representatives of the different European Jewish communities under Nazi rule. The committees were modeled on the governments-in-exile, and their task was to provide moral and material support for Jews in the respective countries, and to prepare a program of Jewish postwar demands. All representative committees together formed the Advisory Council on European Jewish Affairs, which came into being at a conference in New York City in June 1942.

The WJC also lobbied Allied governments on behalf of Jewish refugees, and urged US Jewish organizations to work towards waiving immigration quotas for Jewish refugees fleeing Nazi persecution. In 1940, General Charles de Gaulle, the leader of the French government in exile, pledged to the WJC that all measures taken by the Vichy regime against the Jews would be repudiated upon France's liberation.

In late 1941 and early 1942, Western diplomats and journalists received scattered information about Nazi massacres of many thousands of Jews in German-occupied Poland and Russia. However, the news was difficult to confirm. In June 1942, Ignacy Schwarzbart, one of two Jewish representatives on the Polish National Council of the Polish government-in-exile, held a press conference with WJC officials in London, where it was stated that an estimated one million Jews had already been murdered by the Germans.

==== Riegner Telegram ====
On 8 August 1942, the WJC's Geneva representative Gerhart Riegner sent a telegram to the US vice-consul in Geneva in which he informed the Allies for the first time about the Nazis' planned Final Solution to exterminate all Jews in the German-occupied territories. Riegner had received his information from the German industrialist Eduard Schulte.

His telegram read as follows:

Received alarming report about plan being discussed and considered in Führer headquarters to exterminate at one fell swoop all Jews in German-controlled countries comprising three and a half to four million after deportation and concentration in the east thus solving Jewish question once and for all stop campaign planned for autumn methods being discussed including hydrocyanic acid stop

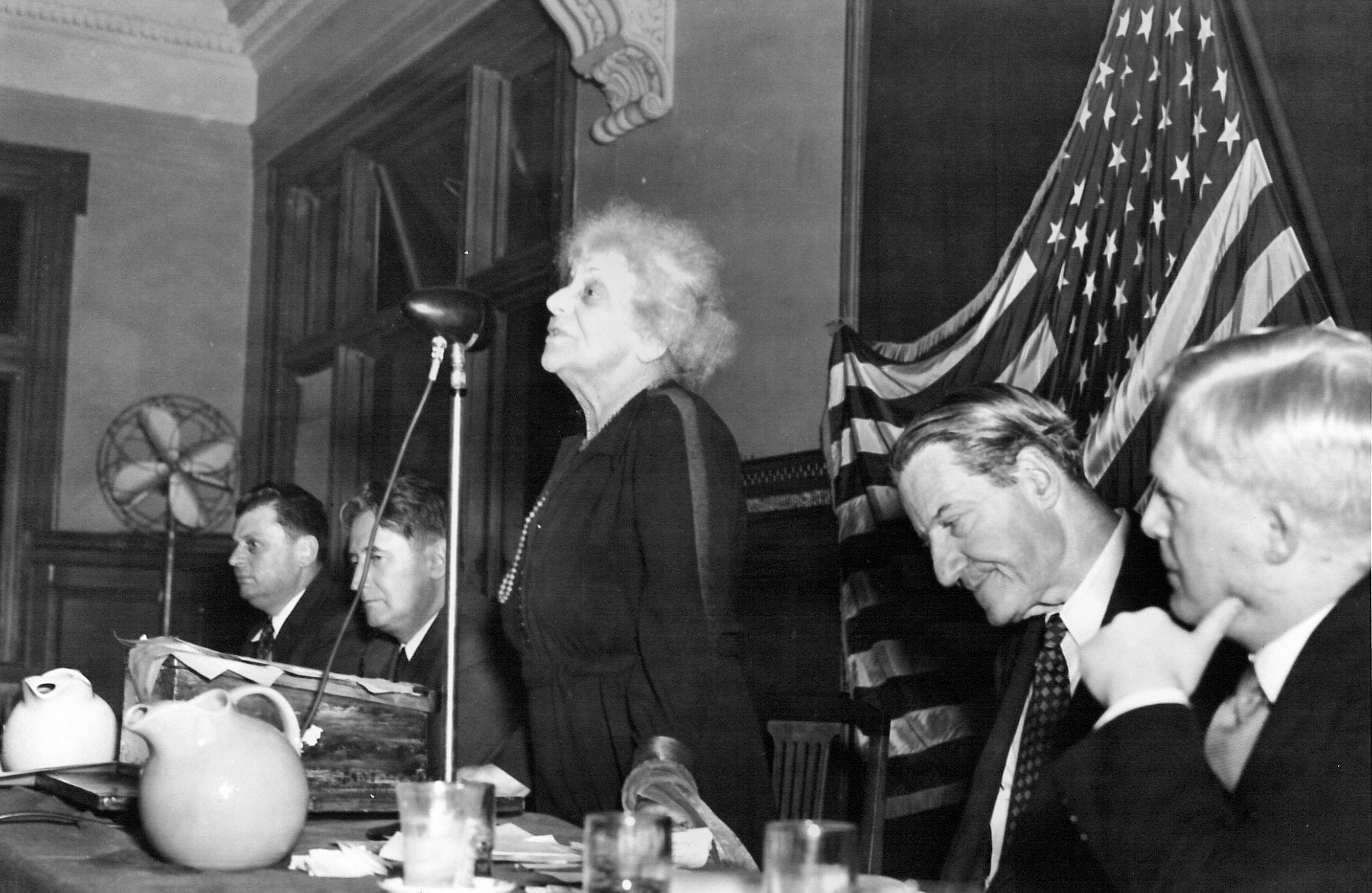
Louise Waterman Wise, Jewish activist and wife of WJC president Stephen S. Wise, addressing the World Jewish Congress War Emergency Conference in Atlantic City, November 1944

It was only several weeks later, on 28 August 1942, that WJC president Stephen S. Wise received Riegner's alarming message. The telegram was met with disbelief despite preexisting evidence for mass executions. The US State Department considered it "a wild rumor, fueled by Jewish anxieties", while the British Foreign Office refused to forward the telegram for the time being and called for the allegations to be investigated first. It was only on 25 November 1942 that the WJC was allowed to release the news to the world.

On 28 July 1942, 20,000 people participated in a WJC-organized "Stop Hitler Now" demonstration at New York's Madison Square Garden. Nine months later, on 1 March 1943, an estimated 22,000 people crowded into the same hall and a further 15,000 stood outside at a WJC rally addressed by Wise, Chaim Weizmann, New York mayor Fiorello LaGuardia and others. However, the US government did not heed calls to rescue European Jews. Early in 1944, US treasury secretary Henry Morgenthau stated in front of President Roosevelt that "certain officials in our State Department" had failed while it would have been commanded by duty to "prevent the extermination of the Jews in German-controlled Europe".

==== Rescue efforts ====
Throughout the war, the WJC lobbied the Allied governments to grant visas to Jewish refugees from Europe and to ensure the restoration of Jewish minority rights in areas liberated by the Allied forces. Despite the US State Department's opposition, the WJC obtained permission from the US Treasury Department, headed by Henry Morgenthau, to transmit funds to Europe for the rescue and assistance of persecuted Jews. According to a report by Riegner, these funds helped to bring 1,350 Jewish children from the occupied countries to Switzerland and 70 to Spain.

However, at the Bermuda Refugee Conference in 1943, both the United States and Britain refused to relax their immigration policies, not even for British Mandatory Palestine. In reaction, the WJC published a comment which said: "The truth is that what stands in the way of aid to the Jews in Europe by the United Nations is not that such a program is dangerous, but simple lack of will to go to any trouble on their behalf." Only in January 1944, President Franklin D. Roosevelt ordered the setting up of the War Refugee Board, whose purpose was to "rescue victims of enemy oppression who are in imminent danger of death".

The World Jewish Congress also tried – mostly in vain – to convince the International Committee of the Red Cross (ICRC) to assert its authority more forcefully vis-à-vis the Germans, and urged it to secure the status of civilian prisoners of war under the Third Geneva Convention on prisoners of war for those Jews that were confined to ghettos and Nazi concentration camps, which would have entitled the ICRC to provide care to them. However, the ICRC stuck to the view that it was "in no position to bring pressure to bear upon governments", and that the success of its work "depended on discreet and friendly successions".

The Holocaust era president of WJC, Stephen Wise, used his great influence with Jewish communities nationwide to energetically obstruct the Bergson Group's strategical level rescue activism. Later president of the WJC Nachum Goldman told the State Department (per department protocol) that Hillel Kook (aka Peter Bergson) is an adventurer and does not represent "organized Jewry". He pleaded to either deport or draft Hillel Kook in order to stop his activism, which organized Jewry strongly opposed. Eleanor Roosevelt, many from Hollywood and Broadway and many in Congress supported the Bergson Group, including Senator Harry Truman for a while.

==== Letter to State Department ====
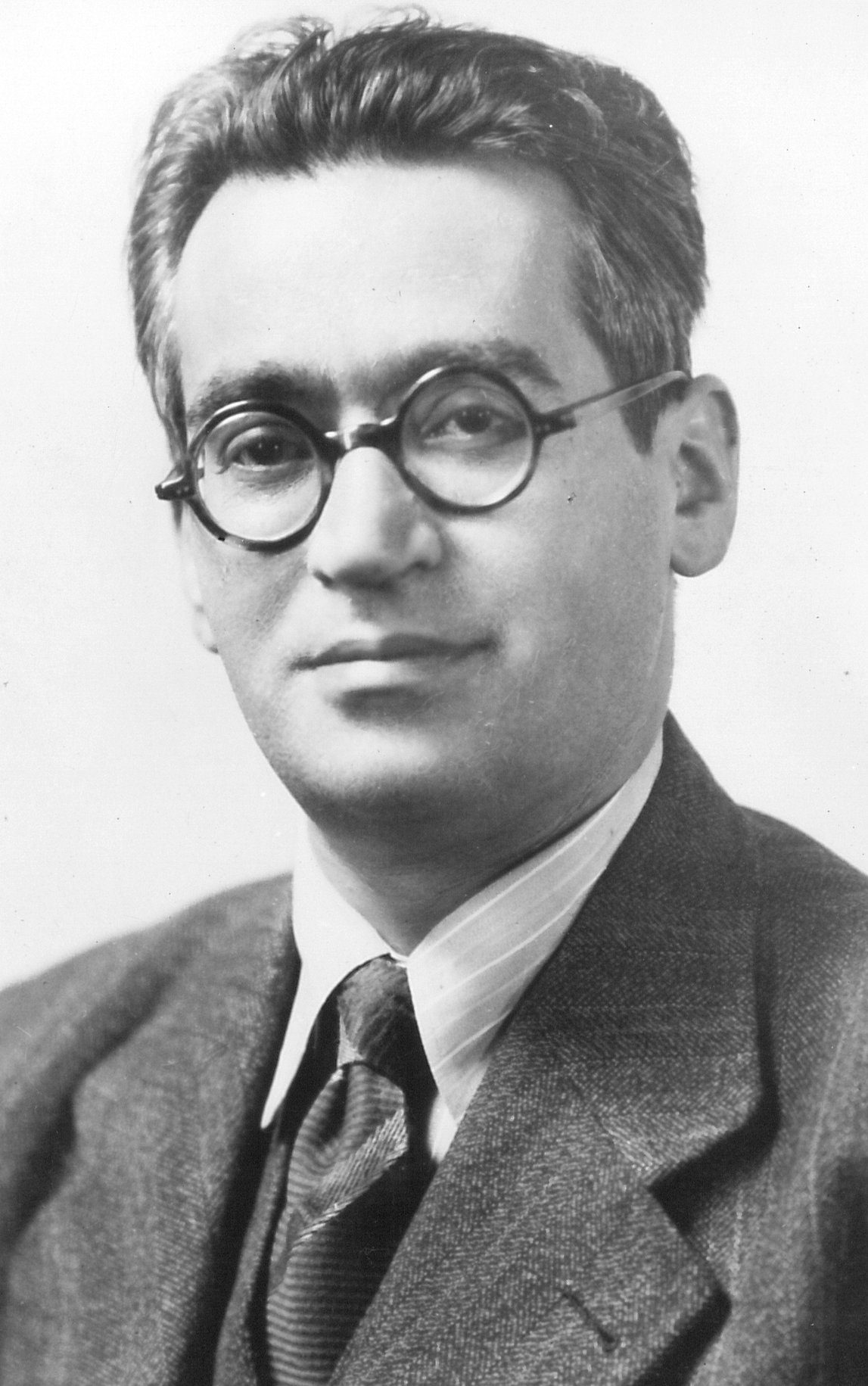
Aryeh Leon Kubowitzki

On 9 August 1944, Leon Kubowitzki (later Aryeh Leon Kubovy), the head of the WJC's Rescue Department, relayed a message from Ernest Frischer of the Czechoslovak State Council to the US State Department urging the destruction of the gas chambers and the bombing of railways lines leading to the Auschwitz death camp. US Undersecretary of War John J. McCloy rejected the suggestion five days later, writing to Kubowitzki:

After a study it became apparent that such an operation could be executed only by the diversion of considerable air support essential to the success of our forces now engaged in decisive operations elsewhere and would in any case be of such doubtful efficacy that it would not warrant the use of our resources.

In November 1944, at the War Emergency Conference held in Atlantic City, USA, the WJC elaborated a program for the post-war period, which included calls for reparations from Germany to Jews and the use of heirless Jewish property for Jewish rehabilitation. Also at that conference, Stephen S. Wise was elected president of the World Jewish Congress. Delegates decided to embark on a $10,000,000 fund-raising effort for relief and increased political activity throughout the world. The news agency JTA also reported the following:

The closing session of the conference also adopted a resolution recommending that the Congress establish a Department of Community Service which would be charged with aiding in the reconstruction of the spiritual and cultural life of Jews in liberated countries. Another resolution extended the gratitude of the gathering to the Vatican and to the Governments of Spain, Sweden and Switzerland for the protection they offered under difficult conditions to the persecuted Jews in German-dominated Europe. At the same time, it expressed regret at the fact that 'deplorably little has been done to have Axis civilians under the power of the United Nations exchanged for Jews in ghettos, internment, concentration and labor camps.'

Related video: Stephen Wise addresses the World Jewish Congress War Emergency Conference in Atlantic City, November 1944

==== Meeting with Heinrich Himmler ====
In February 1945, the head of the Swedish office of the WJC, Hilel Storch, established contact through an intermediary with SS chief Heinrich Himmler. In April, Norbert Masur of the Swedish Section of the WJC secretly met with Himmler at Harzfeld, around 70 kilometers north of Berlin. Masur had been promised safe conduct by Himmler. Through negotiations with the Nazi leader and the subsequent talks with the head of the Swedish Red Cross, Folke Bernadotte, the WJC was allowed to save 4,500 inmates from the women's concentration camp at Ravensbrück. Approximately half of these women, who had been deported to Germany from over forty countries, were Jewish.

==== Post-war efforts ====
At the end of the war, the WJC undertook efforts to rebuild Jewish communities in Europe, pushed for indemnification and reparation claims against Germany, provided assistance to displaced persons and survivors of the Holocaust, and advocated for the punishment of Nazi leaders for war crimes and crimes against humanity. The World Jewish Congress notably took part in the formulation of the principles governing the Nuremberg War Crimes Tribunal and furnished evidence against Nazi leaders to the US prosecutors.

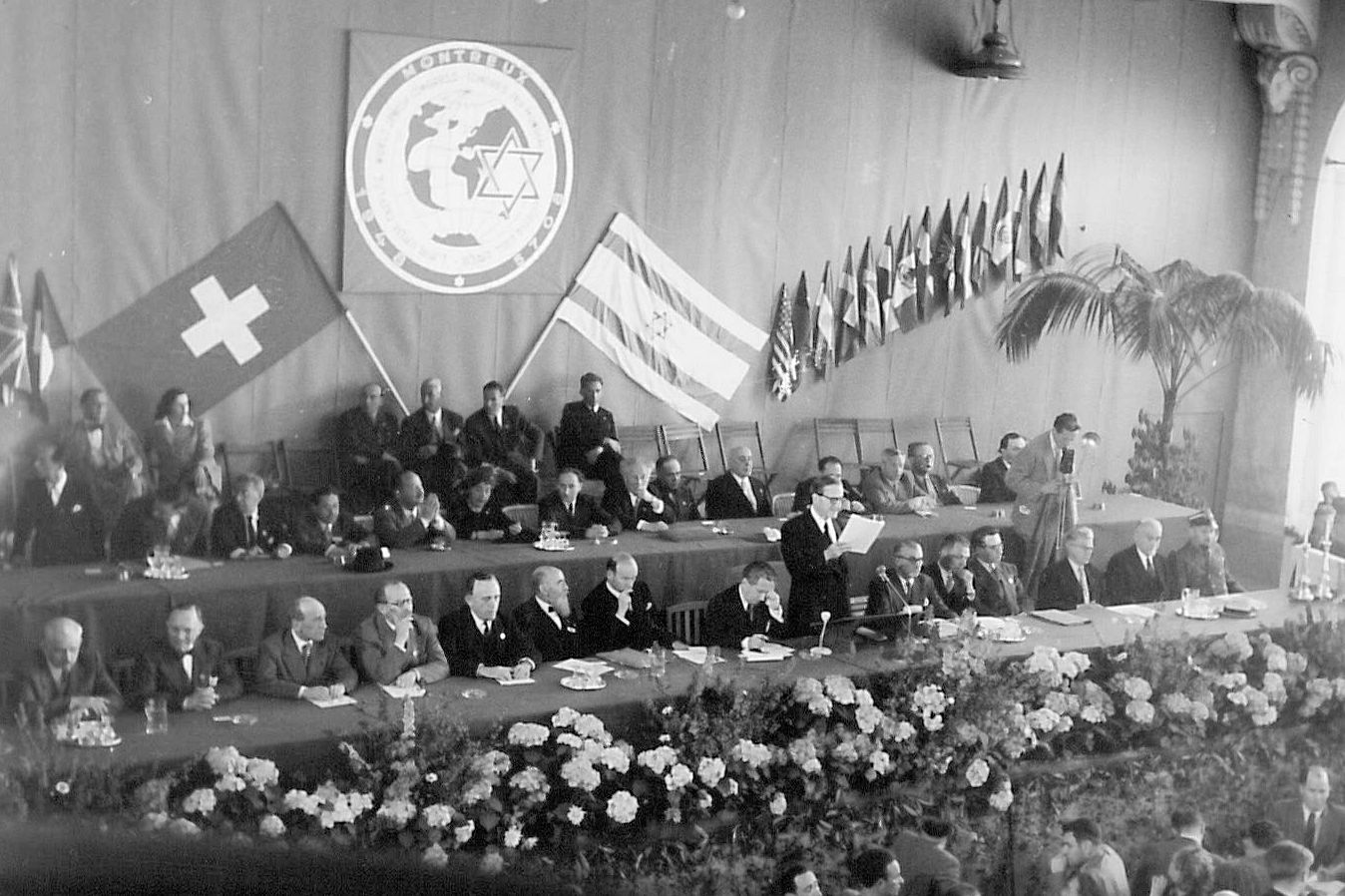
Stephen Wise addresses World Jewish Congress Plenary Assembly in Montreux, Switzerland, August 1948

On 19 August 1945, a conference of representatives of European Jews was organized in Paris, France by the WJC, whose leadership (Wise, Goldmann, Kubowitzki) traveled there from the US. Delegates from Britain, France, Belgium, the Netherlands, Italy, Sweden and Switzerland attended the gathering.

On 21 September 1945, Pope Pius XII received WJC Secretary General Leon Kubowitzki in audience, who recounted to the pope the "great losses" suffered by the Jews during the war and expressed gratitude for what the church had done to help "our persecuted people". Kubowitzki suggested a papal encyclical on the Catholic Church's attitude toward the Jews and a condemnation of antisemitism. "We will consider it," Pius XII reportedly replied, adding: "certainly, most favorably, with all our love". The WJC also urged the Vatican to assist in the recovery of Jewish children saved by Catholics during the Holocaust.

The WJC also supported the founding of the United Nations Organization in 1945. In 1947, the organization became one of the first NGOs to be granted consultative status with the United Nations Economic and Social Council (ECOSOC).

In 1947, an estimated 30,000 people attended the opening of the Latin American Conference of the World Jewish Congress at Luna Park, Buenos Aires, Argentina.

=== Creation of the State of Israel ===
Although its principal purpose was to defend the rights of Jews in the Diaspora, the WJC always actively supported the aims of Zionism, i.e. creation of a Jewish National Home in British Mandatory Palestine. The Yishuv, the Jewish community in British Mandatory Palestine, was represented at the First Plenary Assembly of the WJC in 1936, which affirmed in a resolution "the determination of the Jewish people to live in peaceful cooperation with their Arab neighbors on the basis of mutual respect for the rights of each".

In 1946, in a memorandum to the Anglo-American Committee of Inquiry on Palestine drafted by WJC Political Secretary Alexander L. Easterman, the WJC declared that "the only hope of reviving the life and culture of the Jewish people lies in the establishment of a fully self-governing Jewish Homeland, recognised as such throughout the world; that is, a Jewish Commonwealth in Palestine."

WJC officials lobbied UN member states in favor of the adoption of UN General Assembly Resolution 181 of 1947, which called for the creation of a Jewish and an Arab state in Palestine. On 15 May 1948, the day of Israel's proclamation of independence, the WJC Executive pledged "world Jewry's solidarity" with the fledgling Jewish state. In Montreux, Switzerland, delegates from 34 countries attended the Second Plenary Assembly of the World Jewish Congress, held from 27 June to 6 July 1948.

=== Negotiations with Germany on reparations and compensation ===
In 1949, the World Jewish Congress called on the newly established Federal Republic of Germany to acknowledge responsibility and liability of the German people for the wrongs inflicted on the Jewish people by the Nazi regime. In 1950, the WJC opened an office in Frankfurt to function as a "listening post" on developments in Germany. In representations to the United States, Britain and France, the WJC detailed Jewish moral and material claims on Germany. In 1951, Nahum Goldmann, at the request of the Israeli government, established the Conference on Jewish Material Claims Against Germany (Claims Conference).

The same year, in a declaration approved by the parliament, West German Chancellor Konrad Adenauer recognized Germany's duty to make moral and material restitution to the Jewish people and signaled its readiness to engage in negotiations with Jewish representatives and the State of Israel. "Unspeakable crimes have been committed in the name of the German people, calling for moral and material indemnity [ ... ] The Federal Government are prepared, jointly with representatives of Jewry and the State of Israel [ ... ] to bring about a solution of the material indemnity problem, thus easing the way to the spiritual settlement of infinite suffering," Adenauer said.

On 10 September 1952, WJC and Claims Conference head Nahum Goldmann and the West German federal government signed an agreement embodied in two protocols. Protocol No. 1 called for the enactment of laws that would compensate Nazi victims directly for indemnification and restitution claims arising from Nazi persecution. Under Protocol No. 2, the West German government provided the Claims Conference with 450 million deutschmarks for the relief, rehabilitation and resettlement of Jewish victims of Nazi persecution. Similar agreements were also signed with the State of Israel.

Subsequent to these agreements, the Claims Conference continued to negotiate with the German government for amendments to the various legislative commitments and monitored the implementation of the various compensation and restitution laws. According to the Claims Conference, more than 278,000 Jewish Holocaust survivors received lifetime pensions under the German Federal Indemnification Laws. Germany expended a total of US$60 billion in satisfaction of Jewish claims.

In 1952, the World Jewish Congress called on the Austrian government to intensify efforts for the restitution of heirless Jewish property. Austrian Chancellor Leopold Figl subsequently pledged to remedy Jewish grievances.

At the Third Plenary Assembly in Geneva (4 to 11 August 1953), Nahum Goldmann was elected president of the World Jewish Congress, having previously served as acting president.

=== Zionism and Jewish rights in the Soviet Union ===
Although the Soviet Union initially supported the creation of the State of Israel, during the 1950s the Jewish state emerged as part of the Western camp, and Zionism raised fears of internal dissent and opposition among the Communist leadership.

During the later part of the Cold War, Soviet Jews were suspected of being traitors, Western sympathizers, or security liabilities. The Communist leadership closed down various Jewish organizations and declared Zionism an ideological enemy. Synagogues were often placed under police surveillance, both openly and through the use of informers. As a result of the persecution, both state-sponsored and unofficial, antisemitism became deeply ingrained in the society and remained a fact for years. The Soviet media, when depicting political events, sometimes used the term 'fascism' to characterize Israeli nationalism. Jews often suffered hardships, epitomized by often not being allowed to enlist in universities, work in certain professions, or participate in government. Many Jews felt compelled to hide their identities by changing their names.

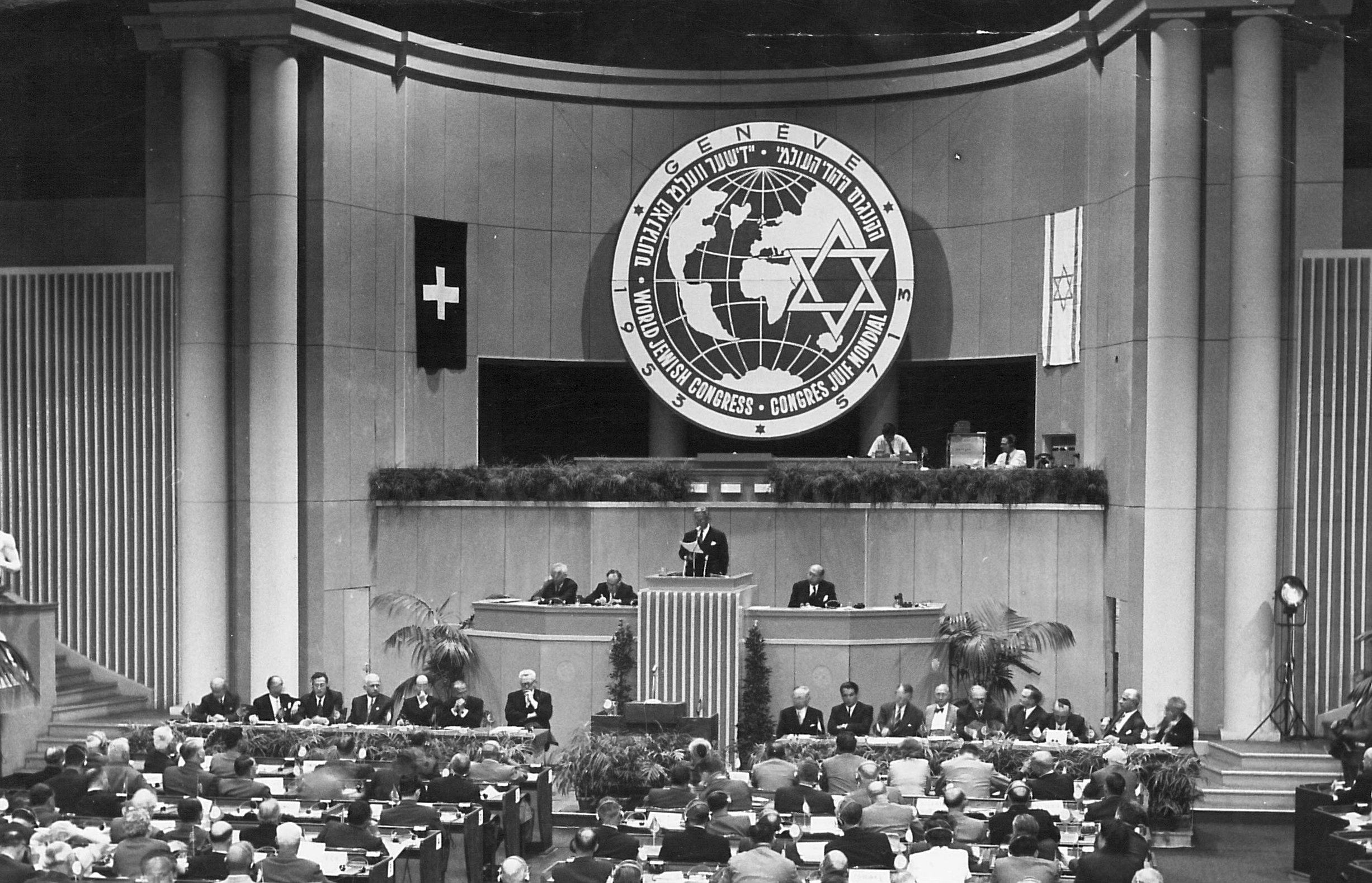
Third Plenary Assembly of the World Jewish Congress, Geneva, Switzerland, 4–11 August 1953

In 1953, the World Jewish Congress condemned the indictment in Moscow of Jewish doctors as alleged conspirators against the Soviet Union leadership, the so-called Doctors' plot, and called a leadership meeting in Zurich, Switzerland, which was canceled at the last minute due to the death of Soviet dictator Joseph Stalin. The new Soviet leadership declared that the case against the doctors had been fabricated.

In 1956, WJC leaders delivered a memorandum to Soviet leaders Nikolai Bulganin and Nikita Khrushchev during their visit to London, and a year later the World Jewish Congress Executive launched a worldwide call to attention regarding the plight of Jews in the Soviet Union and other Communist countries. This resulted in a growing international campaign for their cultural and religious rights and for the reunion of families separated by the Cold War. After a lapse of seven years, the organization also re-established contact with several Jewish communities in Communist Eastern Europe. In 1957, the Jewish community of Hungary re-affiliated with the WJC.

In 1960, the WJC convoked the International Conference on Soviet Jewry in Paris, which was chaired by Goldmann. In 1971, the WJC co-sponsored the First World Conference of Jewish Communities on Soviet Jewry in Brussels, Belgium. Successor events were held in Brussels and Zurich in 1976.

At the second Brussels conference, Jewish leaders called on the Soviet Union to implement the Declaration of Helsinki on human rights, respect its own constitution and laws and "recognize and respect the right of Jews in the USSR to be united with their brethren in the Land of Israel, the Jewish historic homeland". Under the motto, 'Let my people go!, the Soviet Jewry movement caught the attention of statesmen and public figures throughout the West, who considered the Soviet Union's policy toward Jews to be in violation of basic human and civil rights such as freedom of immigration, freedom of religion, and the freedom to study one's own language, culture and heritage. "You have no choice but to release Soviet Jewry," US President Ronald Reagan told Soviet leader Mikhail Gorbachev during the latter's first state visit to the US in 1987.

On 25 March 1987, WJC leaders Edgar M. Bronfman, Israel Singer, Sol Kanee and Elan Steinberg, as well as the head of the Conference of Presidents of Major American Jewish Organizations, Morris B. Abram, arrived in Moscow to discuss the matter with Soviet government ministers, though officials swiftly denied that the USSR had agreed to an increase in Jewish emigration and had invited an Israeli delegation to visit Moscow. Nonetheless, the visits by WJC officials to Moscow were widely seen as helpful in securing the exit permits for prominent Jews in the Soviet Union.

In 1989, Soviet Jewish organizations were granted permission by the authorities to join the World Jewish Congress, and two years later in Jerusalem, several directly elected delegates from the Soviet Union were officially represented for the first time at a World Jewish Congress Plenary Assembly.

=== North Africa and the Middle East ===
In the aftermath of World War II and the establishment of the State of Israel, the World Jewish Congress was actively involved in assisting Jews in Arab and other Muslim countries, who had come under increasing pressure. In January 1948, WJC President Stephen Wise, appealed to US Secretary of State George Marshall: "Between 800,000 and a million Jews in the Middle East and North Africa, exclusive of Palestine, are in 'the greatest danger of destruction' at the hands of Muslims being incited to holy war over the Partition of Palestine ... Acts of violence already perpetrated, together with those contemplated, being clearly aimed at the total destruction of the Jews, constitute genocide, which under the resolutions of the General Assembly is a crime against humanity." The United States, however, did not take any follow-up action to investigate these pleadings.

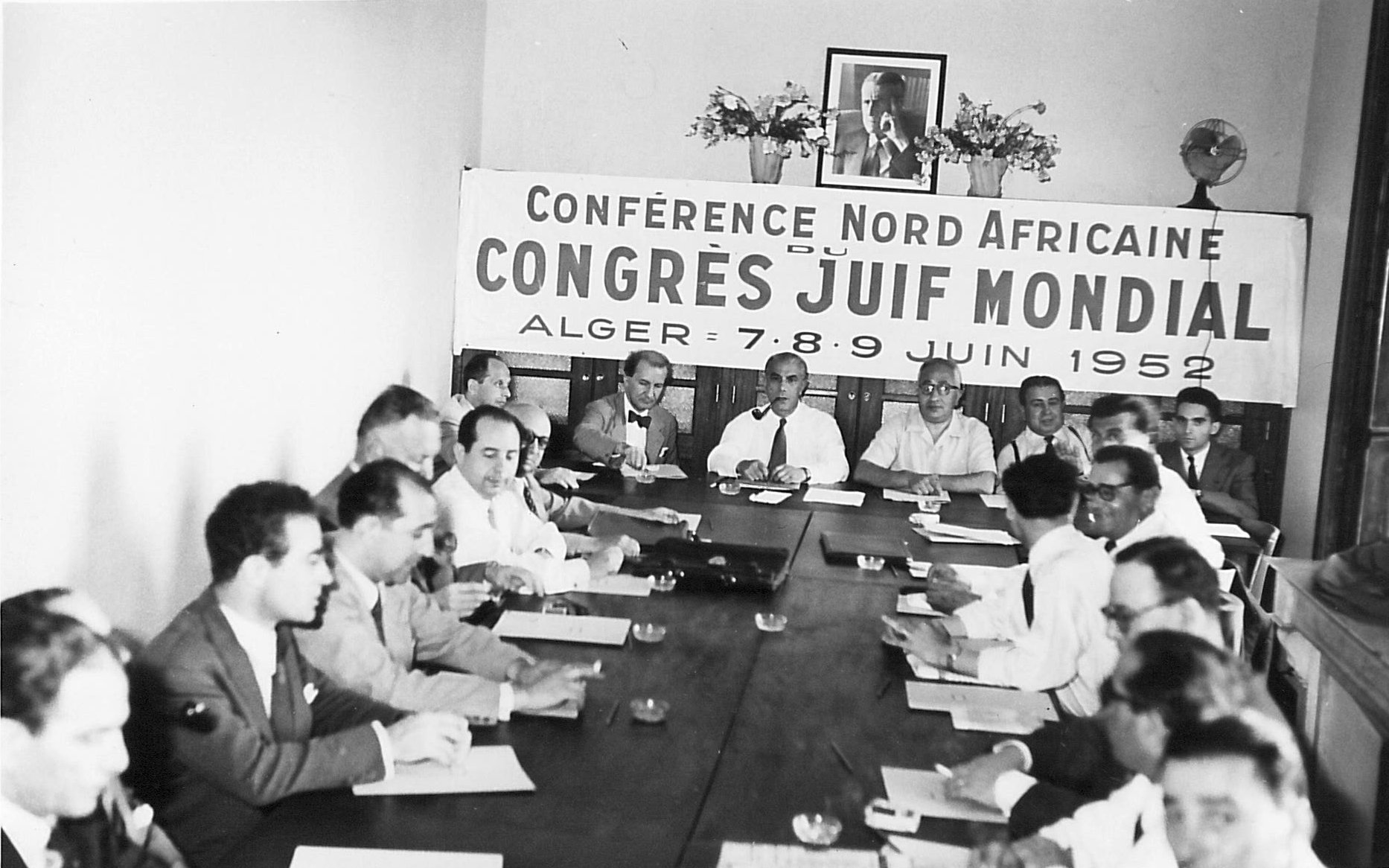
World Jewish Congress conference on the situation of Jews in North Africa, Algiers, 1952

The WJC also submitted a memorandum on the problem to the UN Economic and Social Council, asking for urgent action. The memorandum in particular mentioned an Arab League document which planned to strip Jewish citizens of their rights and belongings as part of a calculated plan. However, when the WJC brought the Arab League document before the ECOSOC, its president Charles H. Malik, a representative of Lebanon to the UN, refused to bring it to the floor.

During the 1950s, the WJC conducted negotiations with a number of Arab governments, notably in North Africa, and pleaded with them to allow their Jewish populations to leave their native countries. With the advance of Arab nationalism, especially during the 1950s, these efforts were increasingly complicated. In 1954, a WJC delegation visited Morocco, then still under French colonial rule.

The WJC leadership also kept in close touch with the leaders of the Moroccan independence movement, including the exiled sultan of Morocco, Mohammed V, who insisted that an autonomous Morocco would guarantee the freedom and equality of all its citizens, including access of non-Muslims to public administration. When Morocco became independent from France in 1956, WJC Political Director Alex Easterman immediately began negotiations with Prime Minister Mbarek Bekkay and other government officials, pressing them to grant Jews the right to leave.

Whilst in 1957 an agreement was reached to allow for the emigration of all 8,000 Jews from Mazagan that were held in a refugee camp near Casablanca, a 1959 WJC report concluded that in spite of repeated assurances by the new government that Jewish rights would be safeguarded, "internal political conflicts have obstructed a solution" to the problem that Moroccan Jews willing to leave the country were denied passports by the authorities. In 1959, Morocco became a member of the Arab League, and all communications with Israel were stopped. However, both King Mohammed V and his successor, Hassan II of Morocco continued to emphasize that Jews enjoyed equal rights in their country. The participation of Marc Sabbah and David Azoulay in the 1961 congress caused controversy and drew antagonism from the newspaper Al-Alam of the Istiqlal Party.

=== Cold War activities ===
Delegates from 43 countries attended the Fourth WJC Plenary Assembly held in Stockholm in 1959.

In 1960, the WJC convoked a special conference in Brussels following a series of antisemitic incidents in Europe. In 1966, the speaker of the West German parliament, Eugen Gerstenmaier, delivered an address titled, 'Germans and Jews – A Problem Unresolved' to the Fifth Plenary Assembly in Brussels, Belgium, becoming the first senior German politician to address a WJC conference, which caused some controversy within the WJC. Some delegates from Israel boycotted the session with Gerstenmaier in protest.

In 1963, the American Section of the WJC was set up to broaden the organization's constituency in the country with the biggest Jewish community worldwide. In 1974, the Board of Deputies of British Jews affiliated with the World Jewish Congress. The British Section of the WJC, which had previously represented UK Jewry, was dissolved.

To emphasize its solidarity with the State of Israel, the WJC held its Sixth Plenary Assembly in 1975 for the first time in Jerusalem, and with one exception, all plenary assemblies have since been held there. The delegates also adopted new statutes and a new structure for the organization, and the WJC entered into a cooperation agreement with the World Zionist Organization.

==== Opposition to UN resolution condemning Zionism as racism ====
The World Jewish Congress was vocal in efforts to repeal United Nations General Assembly Resolution 3379, which was adopted on November 10, 1975, and held "that Zionism is a form of racism and racial discrimination".

The WJC Executive characterized the resolution as an "attempt to defame Zionism by equating it with imperialism, colonialism, racism, and apartheid, ... amounting to incitement to racism and racial hatred". All communities and organizations affiliated to the Congress were urged to take immediate action to mobilize public opinion against the resolution. Israel made revocation of Resolution 3379 a condition of its participation in the Madrid Peace Conference of 1991. Resolution 3379 was revoked in 1991 by UN General Assembly Resolution 4686.

During the 1960s and 1970s, the WJC also campaigned for an end to the Arab boycott of Israel.

==== Leadership changes ====
At the WJC Plenary in 1975, longtime WJC leader Nahum Goldmann (then 80) stood again for WJC president. Several Israeli delegates, notably from the Herut movement, but also former Israeli Prime Minister Golda Meir, opposed Goldmann's re-election for his criticism of Israel's policies, notably with respect to the peace process.

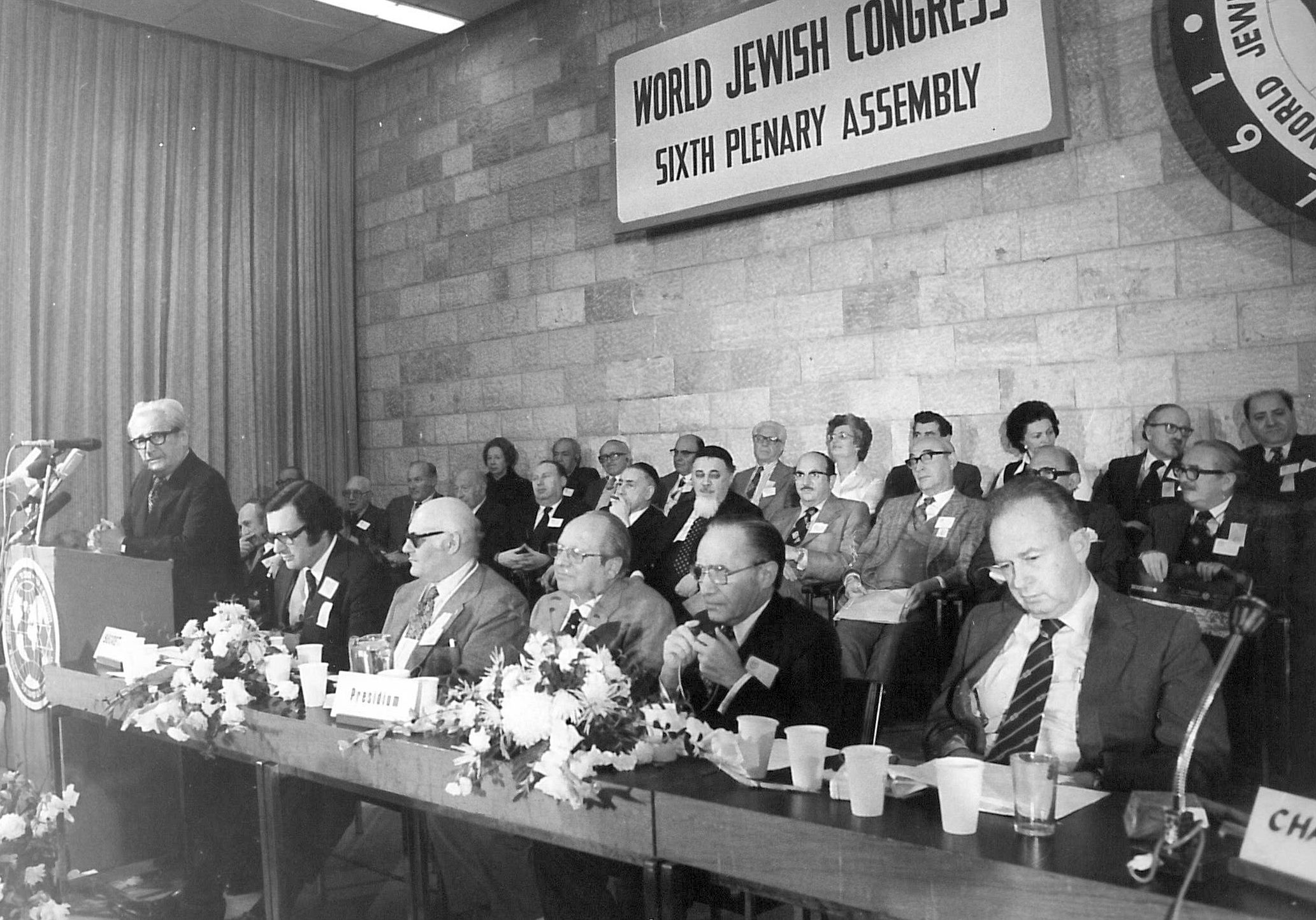
Nahum Goldmann addressing the Sixth WJC Plenary in Jerusalem in 1975. Seated on the right: Israeli Prime Minister Yitzhak Rabin

Two years later, in 1977, the American real estate developer and erstwhile president of B'nai B'rith International Philip Klutznick succeeded Goldmann as WJC president. In 1979, when Klutznick was named US secretary of commerce by President Jimmy Carter, the Canadian-American businessman Edgar Bronfman Sr. took over as acting head of the organization. Bronfman was formally elected WJC president by the Seventh Plenary Assembly, held in Jerusalem in January 1981.

===== Edgar M. Bronfman =====
Under the leadership of Bronfman, the new Secretary General Israel Singer (who took over from Gerhart Riegner in 1983), and Executive Director Elan Steinberg, the WJC adopted a more aggressive style. Steinberg characterized the change as follows: "For a long time, the World Jewish Congress was meant to be the greatest secret of Jewish life, because the nature of diplomacy after the war was quiet diplomacy. This is a newer, American-style leadership — less timid, more forceful, unashamedly Jewish." Bronfman led the World Jewish Congress in becoming the preeminent Jewish organization. He broadened its organizational base by bringing in new member communities in Europe. Through campaigns to free Soviet Jewry, the exposure of the Nazi past of Austrian President Kurt Waldheim, and the campaign to compensate victims of the Holocaust, Bronfman became well known internationally in the 1980s and 1990s.

On 25 June 1982, WJC President Edgar Bronfman became the first leader ever of a Jewish organization to address the United Nations General Assembly.

==== Controversy over Catholic convent's presence at Auschwitz ====
In 1985, Carmelite nuns opened a convent near the site of the former Nazi death camp Auschwitz I. WJC President Edgar Bronfman called for the removal of the convent. In public statements, other Jewish leaders, including former WJC Secretary General Gerhart Riegner, also called for the removal. A year later, the Catholic Church agreed to those requests and said the convent would be removed within two years.

However, the Carmelites stayed put, and a year later erected a large cross from a 1979 mass with the Pope near their site. The World Jewish Congress Executive strongly urged the Vatican to take action against the convent's presence and said Pope John Paul II should "exercise his authority" to order the prompt removal of convent and cross. The WJC Executive said the pontiff's action was necessary to implement the agreement major European Catholic cardinals, including the cardinal of Kraków, Franciszek Macharski, had signed with Jewish leaders on 22 February 1987 in Geneva. Edgar Bronfman declared: "It is not only a matter of the Auschwitz convent, but the broader implications of historical revisionism in which the uniqueness of the Holocaust and the murder of the Jewish people is being suppressed."

A few months later, the Carmelites were ordered by Rome to move. The WJC praised the Vatican for taking action, although the nuns remained on the site until 1993, leaving the large cross behind.

==== Diplomatic contacts with Communist countries ====
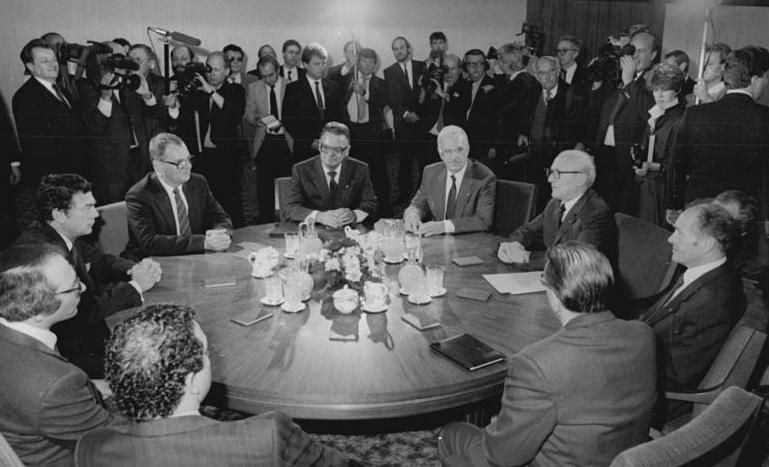
Meeting of a WJC delegation led by Edgar Bronfman with GDR leader Erich Honecker, in East Berlin, October 1988

During the mid-1980s, the World Jewish Congress also entered into diplomatic talks with several Central and Eastern European countries, notably Communist East Germany, whose leadership the WJC urged to recognize its obligations to Jewish victims of Nazi Germany. In February 1990, GDR Prime Minister Hans Modrow sent a letter to WJC President Edgar Bronfman in which he recognized on behalf of the East German government the GDR's responsibility for German crimes committed against the Jewish people under the Nazi regime. In a statement, Modrow said:

The German Democratic Republic stands unalterably by its duty to do everything against racism, Nazism, anti-Semitism, and hatred among peoples, so that, in the future, war and fascism will never again start from German soil, but only peace and understanding among people.

A few weeks later, the first freely elected parliament of the GDR, the Volkskammer, passed a resolution which recognized the GDR's responsibility for the Holocaust and asked "Jews around the world for forgiveness". The GDR pledged to compensate for material damages to Jews and to safeguard Jewish traditions. The resolution became part of the German reunification treaty and continues to be part of German law.

In 1987, the World Jewish Congress held a meeting of its executive committee in Budapest, Hungary, the first WJC gathering in Communist Eastern Europe since the end of World War II. The Hungarian government had accepted that there would to be no restrictions to the attendance of Israeli delegates or the subjects of discussion.

==== Waldheim affair ====
In 1986, the World Jewish Congress alleged that Austrian presidential candidate Kurt Waldheim, a former secretary general of the United Nations, had lied about his service as an officer in the mounted corps of the Nazi Party "Sturmabteilung" (SA), and his time as German ordnance officer in Thessaloniki, Greece, from 1942 to 1943.

Waldheim called the allegations "pure lies and malicious acts". In a telex to Bronfman, he said that his past had been "deliberately misinterpreted". Nevertheless, he admitted that he had known about German reprisals against partisans: "Yes, I knew. I was horrified. But what could I do? I had either to continue to serve or be executed." He said that he had never fired a shot or even seen a partisan. His former immediate superior at the time stated that Waldheim had "remained confined to a desk".

Former Austrian Jewish chancellor Bruno Kreisky called the World Jewish Congress's actions an "extraordinary infamy" adding that in election, Austrians "won't allow the Jews abroad to order us about and tell us who should be our President".

In view of the ongoing international controversy, the Austrian government decided to appoint an international committee of historians to examine Waldheim's life between 1938 and 1945. Their report found no evidence of any personal involvement of Waldheim in those crimes. At the same time, although he had stated that he was unaware of any crimes taking place, the historians cited evidence that Waldheim must have known about war crimes.

Throughout his term as president (1986–1992), Waldheim and his wife Elisabeth were officially deemed "personae non gratae" by the United States. They could visit only Arab countries and the Vatican City. In 1987, they were put on a watch list of persons banned from entering the United States and remained on the list even after the publication of the International Committee of Historians' report on his military past in the Wehrmacht.

On May 5, 1987, Bronfman spoke to the World Jewish Congress saying Waldheim was "part and parcel of the Nazi killing machine". Waldheim subsequently filed a lawsuit against Bronfman, but dropped the suit shortly after due to a lack of evidence in his favor.

=== Restitution of Holocaust-era assets and compensation payments ===
In 1992, the World Jewish Congress established the World Jewish Restitution Organization (WJRO), an umbrella body of Jewish organizations and including the Jewish Agency for Israel. Its purpose is to pursue the restitution of Jewish property in Europe, outside Germany (which is dealt with by the Claims Conference). According to its website, the WRJO's mission is to consult and negotiate "with national and local governments to conclude agreements and ensure legislation concerning the restitution of property to the Jewish people", to conduct "research on Jewish property in national and local archives and to establish a central data bank in which information on Jewish communal property will be recorded and assembled, and to allocate "funds for the preservation of Jewish cultural and educational projects in that country. To date, such funds have been establishes in Poland, Romania and Hungary." Current World Jewish Congress President Ronald S. Lauder is chairman of the WRJO.

==== Swiss bank settlement ====
In the late 1990s, as President of the WJC, Edgar Bronfman championed the cause of restitution from Switzerland for Holocaust survivors. Bronfman began an initiative that led to the $1.25 billion settlement from Swiss banks, aiming to resolve claims "that the Swiss hoarded bank accounts opened by Jews who were murdered by the Nazis".

In total, the WJC, the Conference on Jewish Material Claims Against Germany, the World Jewish Restitution Organization, and the International Commission on Holocaust Era Insurance Claims, founded in 1998, have secured millions of dollars for the victims and survivors of the Holocaust in payments from Germany, Swiss banks, Insurances and other parties totaling $20 billion.

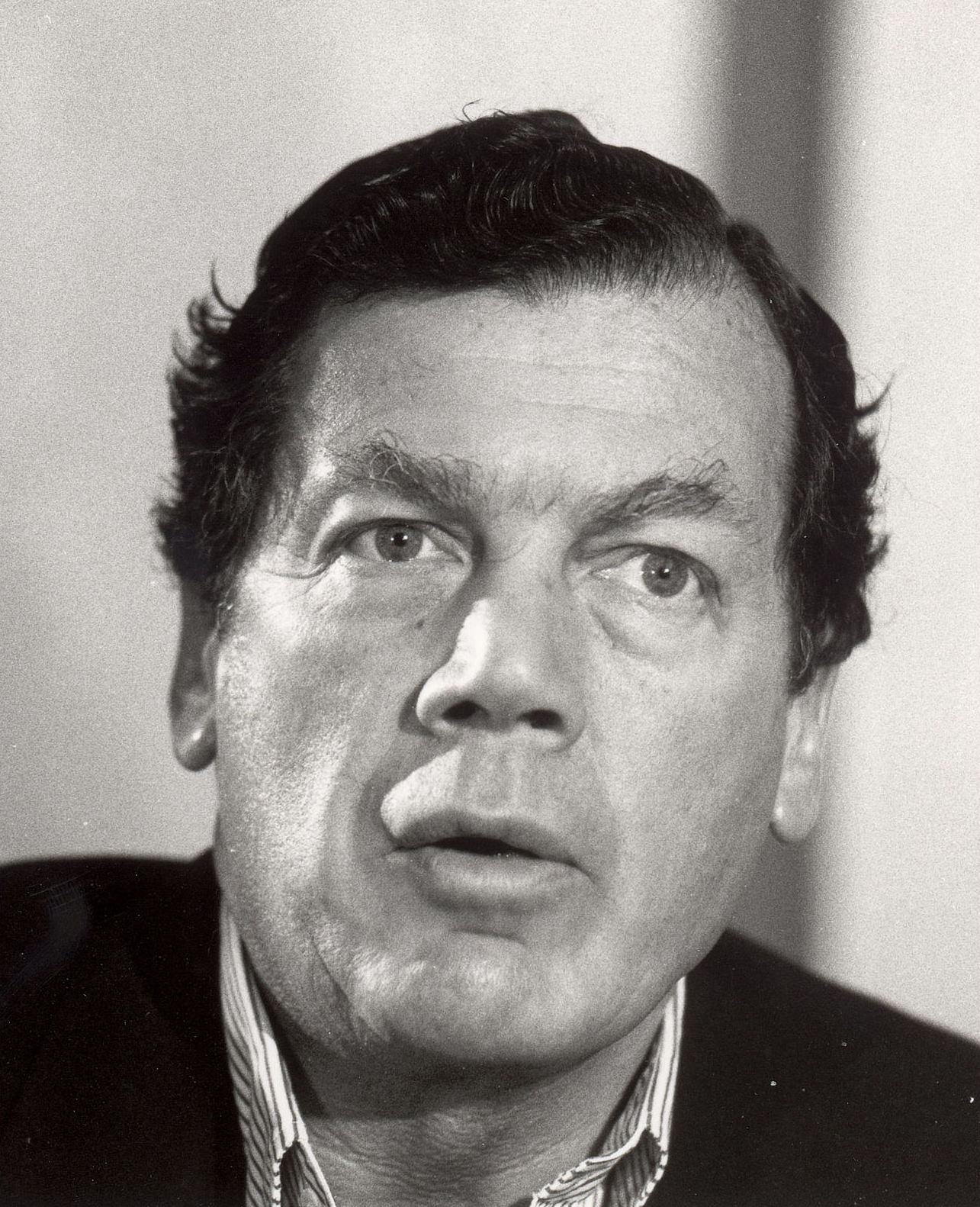
Edgar M. Bronfman

In 1995, the WJC initiated negotiations on behalf of various Jewish organizations with Swiss banks and the government of Switzerland over so-called dormant World War II-era bank accounts of Holocaust victims. The WJC entered a class-action lawsuit in Brooklyn, NY alleging that Holocaust victims and their families faced improper barriers to accessing WWII-era Swiss bank accounts because of requirements such as death certificates (typically non-existent for Holocaust victims), and that some Swiss banks made deliberate efforts to retain the account balances indefinitely. The claims also included the value of art works purported to have been stolen, "damages" to persons denied admission to Switzerland on the strength of refugee applications, and the value or cost of labor purported to have been performed by persons being maintained at Swiss government expense in displaced-person camps during the Holocaust, along with interest on such claims from the time of loss. The WJC marshaled the support of US government officials including New York Senator Alfonse D'Amato, who held hearings of the Senate Banking Committee on the topic and claimed that "hundreds of millions of dollars" of WWII-era Jewish assets remained in Swiss banks. At the behest of US President Bill Clinton, Undersecretary of Commerce Stuart Eizenstat testified at these hearings that Swiss banks knowingly purchased looted gold from the Nazis during WWII. Eizenstat was later named special envoy of the US government for Holocaust issues. The report relied exclusively on US government archives. It contained no new historical information on Nazi victims' deposits into Swiss banks, and criticized the decisions of US officials who negotiated settlements with Switzerland after the war as being too lenient.

Audits ordered by the Swiss government of dormant accounts between 1962 and 1995 showed a total of US$32 million (in 1995 terms) in unclaimed war-era accounts. However, during the negotiations, the Swiss banks agreed to commission another audit of wartime accounts, headed by former US Federal Reserve Chairman Paul Volcker. The Volcker Commission report concluded that the 1999 book value of all dormant accounts possibly belonging to victims of Nazi persecution that were unclaimed, closed by the Nazis or closed by unknown persons was CHF 95 million. Of this total, CHF 24 million were "probably" related to victims of Nazi persecution.

The commission recommended that for settlement purposes, the book values should be modified back to 1945 values (by adding back fees paid and subtracting interest) and then be multiplied by 10 to reflect average long-term investment rates in Switzerland. On 12 August 1998, several major Swiss banks agreed to pay Holocaust survivors and their relatives more than US$1.25 billion over the following three years. As part of the settlement, the plaintiffs agreed to drop a lawsuit against the Government-owned Swiss National Bank in US courts.

==== Nazi gold ====
In 1997, a study commissioned by the World Jewish Congress concluded that Nazi Germany had looted at least US$8.5 billion in gold between 1933 and 1945 from Jews and other victims. The study estimated that a third of the gold had come from individuals and private businesses rather than central banks and that over US$2 billion of privately owned gold eventually ended up in Swiss banks. Switzerland rejected the WJC accusations. In response to inquiries from the World Jewish Congress, the US Federal Reserve Bank admitted in 1997 that personal gold seized by the Nazis was melted into gold bars after the war and then shipped as gold bullion to the central banks of four European countries. In 1996, Sweden also opened an investigation into assertions by the World Jewish Congress that looted Nazi gold from World War II had been deposited in Swedish government bank vaults.

==== Agreements with other European countries on Holocaust-era property restitution and compensation ====
During the 1990s and 2000s, at the behest of the World Jewish Congress a total of 17 European countries established special committees to look into their role during World War II. Many set up funds to compensate Jewish and other victims of the war.

In 1997, French Prime Minister Alain Juppé created a commission to investigate the seizures of Jewish property by the occupying Nazi forces and the French collaborators during the war.

In 2000/2001, the World Jewish Congress helped to negotiate a compensation agreement with the German government and industry under which a €5 billion fund was set up to compensate World War II slave and forced laborers, mainly living Central and Eastern Europe, who had hitherto not received any compensation payments for the suffering under Nazi rule.

==== Restitution of looted art ====
In 1998, the WJC released a list of 2,000 people who allegedly took part in the Nazis' massive looting of art. It named people from 11 countries, including museum curators, gallery owners, art experts and other intermediaries. A few weeks later, in Washington DC, delegates from 44 countries agreed to set up a central registry on art looted by the Nazis which could be established on the Internet.

Ronald S. Lauder, then chairman of the WJC Art Recovery Commission, estimated that 110,000 pieces of art worth between US$10 and 30 billion were still missing. In 2000, the World Jewish Congress criticized museums for waiting for artworks to be claimed by Holocaust victims instead of publicly announcing that they have suspect items. In the wake of the WJC accusations, a number of countries commissioned investigations into Nazi-looted art.

== Organization and related bodies ==
The WJC is made up of five regional branches: WJC North America, the Latin American Jewish Congress, the European Jewish Congress, the Euro-Asian Jewish Congress (working in Russia, Ukraine etc.), and the WJC Israel. Besides that, Jewish umbrella organizations in 100 countries are directly affiliated to the World Jewish Congress. Its highest decision-making body is the Plenary Assembly, which meets every four years and elects the lay leadership (executive committee) of the WJC. In between plenary assemblies, meetings of the WJC Governing Board are normally held once a year. Affiliated Jewish organizations send delegates to these two WJC bodies; their number depends on the size of the Jewish communities they represent.

A special meeting of the Plenary Assembly, attended by over 400 delegates and observers from over 70 countries, was held in Buenos Aires in March 2015. The last regular plenary assembly was held In New York in April 2017, and prior to that in Budapest in May 2013, with 600 delegates and observers in attention.

The WJC also maintains a Research Institute based in Jerusalem, Israel. It is involved in research and analysis of a variety of issues of importance to contemporary Jewry, and its findings are published in the form of policy dispatches.

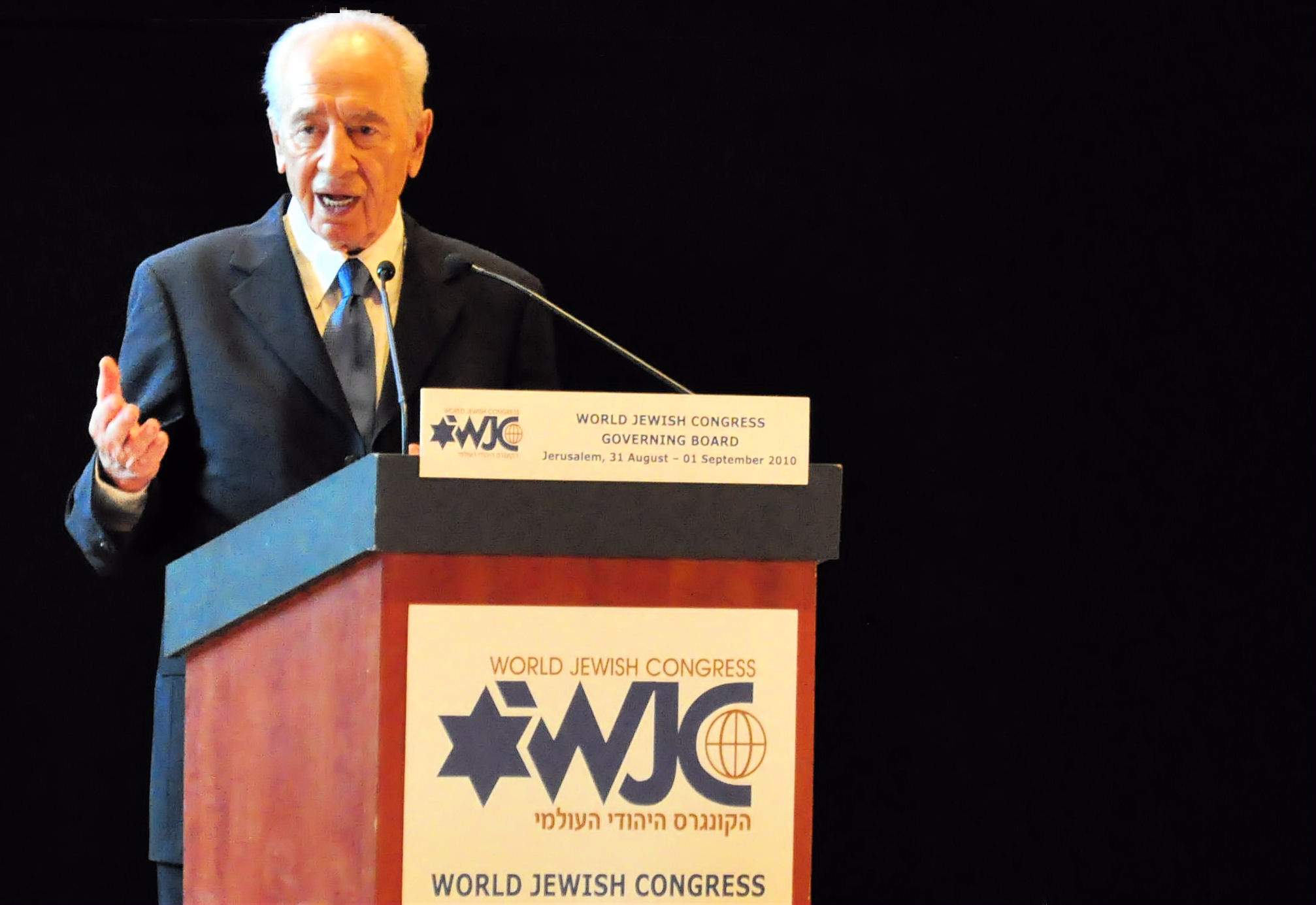
Israel's President Shimon Peres addresses a Governing Board meeting of the WJC in Jerusalem, August 2010

Operating under the auspices of the World Jewish Congress in Israel, the Israel Council on Foreign Relations has since its inception in 1989 hosted heads of state, prime ministers, foreign ministers and other distinguished visitors to Israel and has issued several publications on Israeli foreign policy and international affairs, including its tri-annual foreign policy journal, the Israel Journal of Foreign Affairs.

The WJC's current policy priorities include combating anti-Semitism, especially the rise of neo-Nazi parties in Europe, providing political support for Israel, opposing the "Iranian threat", and dealing with the legacy of the Holocaust, notably with respect to property restitution, reparation and compensation for Holocaust survivors, as well as with Holocaust remembrance. One of the WJC's major programs is concerned with the plight of Jewish exodus from Arab and Muslim countries. The WJC is also involved in inter-faith dialogue with Christian and Muslim groups.

=== Current leadership ===
At the 13th Plenary Assembly in Jerusalem in January 2009, Ronald S. Lauder was formally and unanimously elected as WJC president, having previously served as acting president. Lauder was confirmed in his post by the 14th Plenary Assembly, which took place in Budapest in May 2013, and for a third term by the 15th Plenary Assembly in New York, in April 2017.

French banker Baron David René de Rothschild serves as chairman of the WJC Governing Board, and Lebanese-born Chella Safra from Brazil is the treasurer of the organization. Viatcheslav Moshe Kantor, the president of the European Jewish Congress was named as chairman of the WJC Policy Council.

Although the WJC Executive Committee comprises almost 50 members, including the heads of the 12 largest Jewish communities in the world outside Israel, a smaller Steering Committee is running the day-to-day activities of the organization. It is composed of the president, the chairman of the WJC Governing Board, the treasurer, the chairmen of the five regional affiliates, the chairmen of the Policy Council, and other members.

=== Jewish Diplomatic Corps ===
The Jewish Diplomatic Corps (JDCorps), also referred to as World Jewish Diplomatic Corps (WJDC) — is an international network of Jewish professionals engaged in public diplomacy. Initiated in February 2006 by the WJC, it consists of about 300 members, known as Jewish Diplomats (JDs), aged 27 to 45 from more than 50 countries, who are already accomplished professionals. It was turned independent in 2009 by cofounders Adam H. Koffler and Peleg Reshef. At the end of 2021, a delegation of 40 young diplomats from the WJC visited the United Arab Emirates.

== Relations with Poland ==
The WJC has evinced a great interest in Poland, both before the war, when the country was home to some 3.25 million Jews (10 percent of that country's total population, forming the largest Jewish community in Europe); and in the post-war period, when the Jewish community was reconstituted. In second half of the 1930s, in the face of a marked rise in antisemitism, the WJC attempted to intervene on behalf of Polish Jewry. In December 1936, for example, Nahum Goldmann visited Poland and conferred with the Minister of Foreign Affairs Jozef Beck, but this demarche did little to abate the situation. In order to counter the drastic effects of the ban on kosher slaughter (Shechita), the WJC Economic Department prepared a study on the legislation and proposed various relief measures that could be instituted. The WJC also intervened to ensure that Polish Jews deported from Germany at the end of October 1938 and stranded in Zbaszyn would be allowed to resettle elsewhere in Poland.

After the war, when a wave of anti-Jewish violence swept the country, the WJC prevailed upon the Polish government to remove all obstacles faced by Jews who sought to leave the country and for the most part Jews were able to emigrate unhindered until about 1950. Most left without visas or exit permits thanks to a decree of Gen. Spychalski.

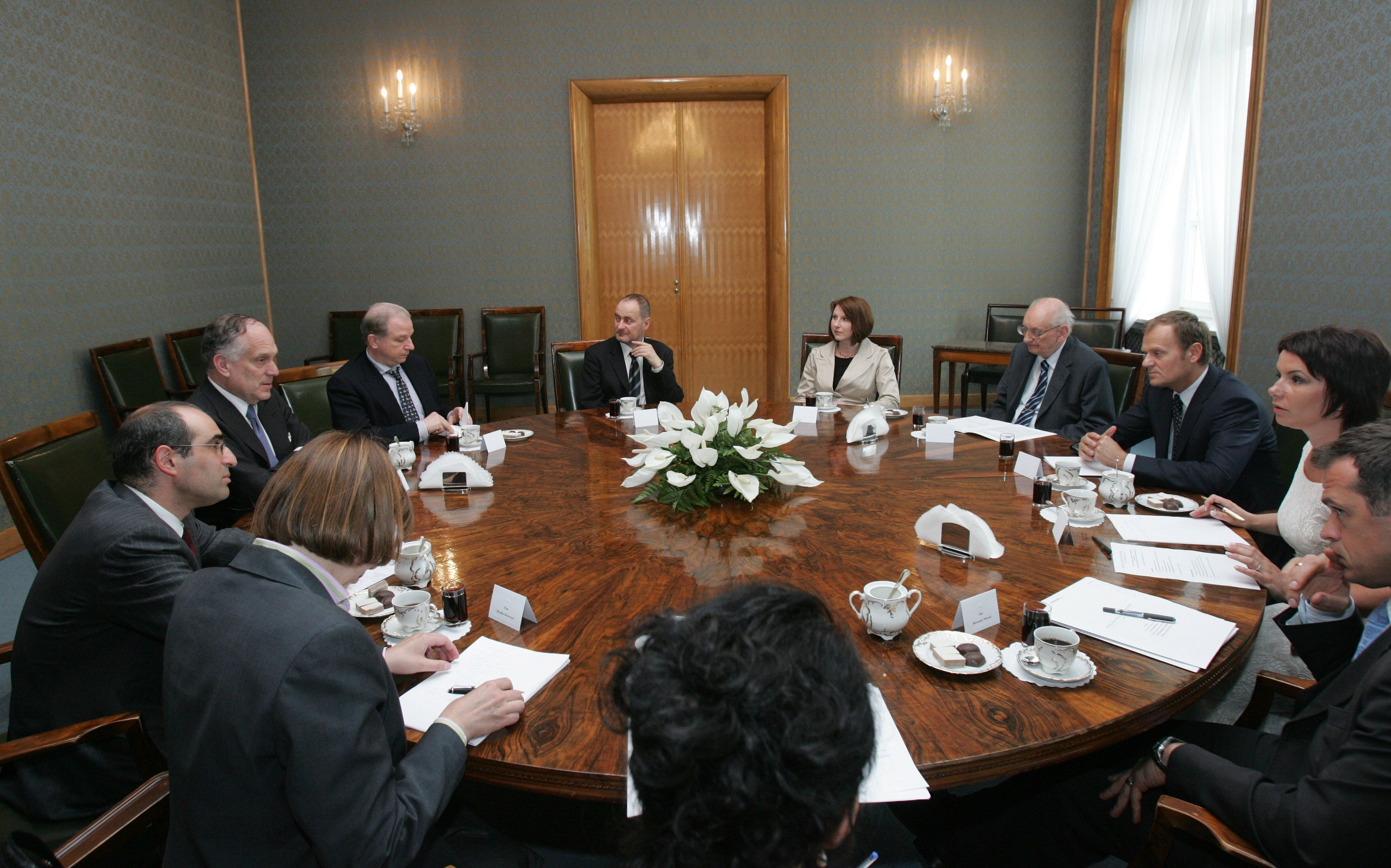
A World Jewish Congress delegation meets with Polish Prime Minister Donald Tusk, June 2008

As the Jewish community dwindled, over successive waves of emigration (the last in 1968), the WJC saw Poland as an important repository of Jewish history as well as the custodians of the killing grounds in which much of European Jewry fell victim to the German Final Solution. In 1979, the Polish government and the WJC worked to have Auschwitz placed on the UNESCO World Heritage list as site of genocide. The organization repeatedly pressed Poland to ensure that in Auschwitz and other Nazi German death camp sites, the memory of the Jews who had been the main victims, would not be subsumed in collective memory. As such, at the end of the 1980s, the organization was deeply involved in the struggle to have the Carmelite convent that had been established on its ground removed. Rabbi David Rosen of the Anti-Defamation League noted at the time: "To some extent the WJC did determine the tune. Their style created the atmosphere in which no public Jewish organization could not get involved. Had the WJC not got involved, those issues might not have developed in the way they did."

In April 2012, President Lauder declared that by prevaricating on the restitution issue Poland was "telling many elderly prewar landowners, including Holocaust survivors, that they have no foreseeable hope of even a small measure of justice for the assets that were seized from them".

In pursuit of a more nuanced approach to the history of Polish-Jewish relations that includes Jewish recognition of Polish losses suffered during World War II, the WJC's Research Institute published two monographs which explored the attempts to revive Polish Jewry and the ways in which Poles and Jews have confronted their common history. Moreover, the Israel Council on Foreign Relations, which operates under the auspices of the World Jewish Congress, together with the Polish Institute for International Affairs, held two successive conferences (one in Warsaw in 2009 and the other in Jerusalem in 2010) to discuss bilateral relations and international issues of mutual concern. At the second gathering the 20th anniversary of the re-establishment of relations between the two countries was marked.

== Support for Israel ==
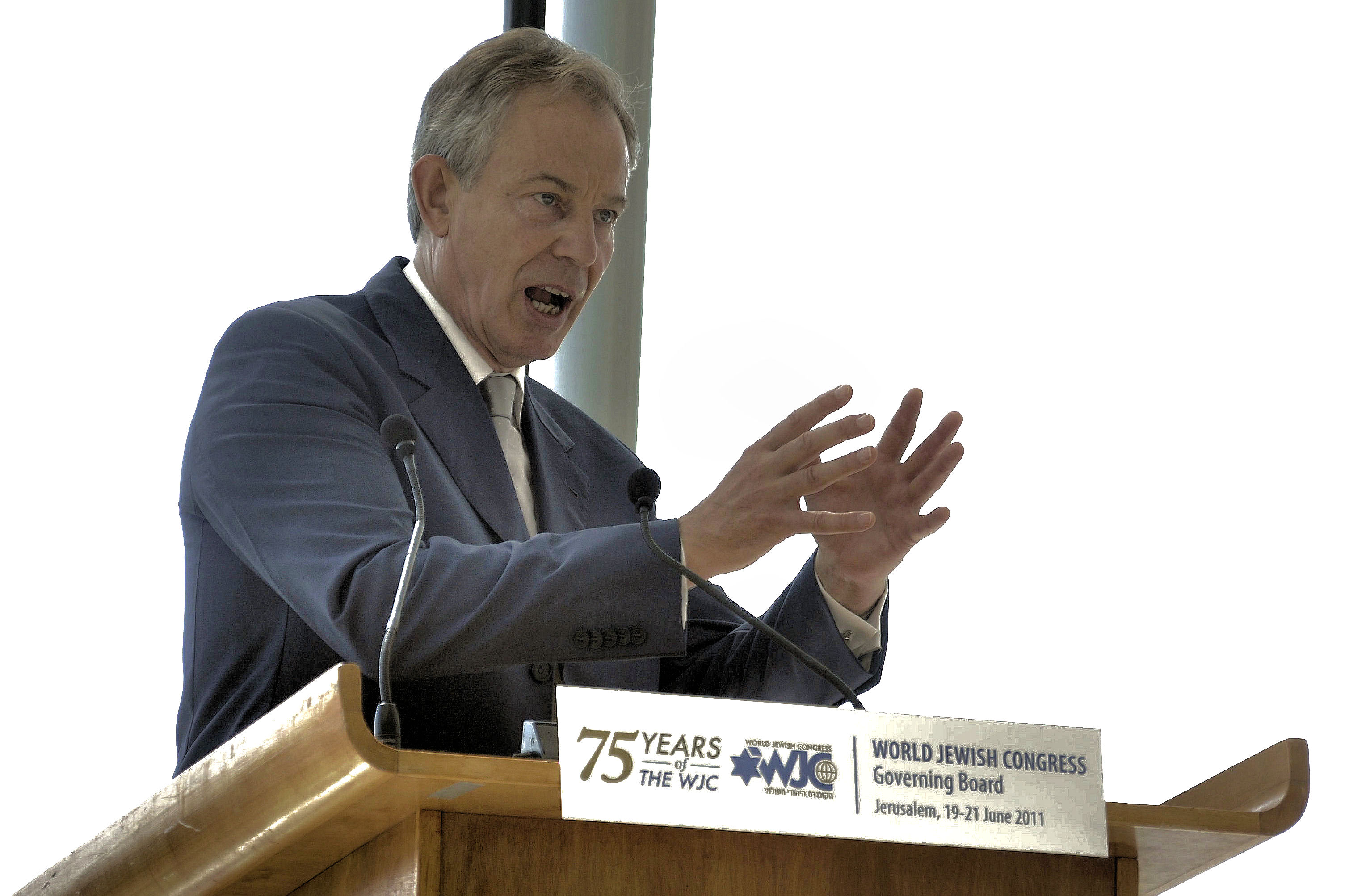
International Quartet for the Middle East envoy Tony Blair briefs delegates at the World Jewish Congress Governing Board in Jerusalem on the peace process, June 2011

The mission statement of the World Jewish Congress says that the organization seeks "to enhance solidarity among Jewish communities throughout the world and, recognizing the centrality of the State of Israel to contemporary Jewish identity, to strengthen the bonds of Jewish communities and Jews in the Diaspora with Israel".

=== Israeli legitimacy ===
By 2021, the WJC started to focus its main activity on countering the delegitimization of Israel.

The WJC says that it lobbies international organizations, notably the United Nations, to ensure that governments "apply the same standards to Israel when judging its actions compared with those of other countries". The WJC states on its website that "Israel should not be singled out for criticism by countries which do not themselves adhere to the principles of democracy, human rights and the rule of law" and that "Israel needs to be treated fairly in international organizations, especially in United Nations bodies such as the UN Human Rights Council."

In April 2017, United Nations Secretary General António Guterres became the first UN chief ever to address a World Jewish Congress gathering and also addressed the issue of bias against Israel. Speaking in New York to the delegates of the WJC Plenary Assembly, Guterres promised to stand up against anti-Israel bias at the world organization and said the Jewish state "must be treated like any other member state". He also stressed that Israel had an "undeniable right to exist and to live in peace and security with its neighbors," and that "the modern form of anti-Semitism is the denial of the existence of the State of Israel".

In September 2011, the World Jewish Congress, together with the International Council of Jewish Parliamentarians, assembled in New York to lobby the international community against allowing the Palestinian Authority's unilateral move to become a full member of the United Nations and bypass negotiations with Israel. At a dinner hosted by WJC President Lauder, the delegation of Jewish parliamentarians engaged in an open discussion with UN ambassadors from key countries including Germany, France, Poland and Russia.

Ronald Lauder, writing in the German newspaper Die Welt, called for Israel to be admitted into the Western alliance NATO: "Israel needs real guarantees for its security. European NATO member states – including Turkey – must admit the state of Israel into the Western alliance," the WJC president wrote. He referred to the uprisings in Egypt and Tunisia and said they were reminders of how "unpredictable" developments in the Middle East were. Israeli NATO membership "would send a strong signal to other countries not to take on Israel", Lauder argued.

In June 2012, on the third anniversary of Israeli Prime Minister Benjamin Netanyahu's speech at Bar-Ilan University, Lauder published a full-page ad in The Wall Street Journal and other newspapers in which he called on Palestinian President Mahmoud Abbas to return to the negotiating table. "Accept the offer to talk, President Abbas. It takes two sides to make peace," Lauder wrote.

== Holocaust remembrance ==
Preserving the memory of the Shoah is a key issue in the WJC's public efforts. In January 2011, WJC President Lauder accompanied German President Christian Wulff and a number of Holocaust survivors to Auschwitz. Lauder declared:

Auschwitz is the largest Jewish cemetery in the world. Auschwitz is where the systematic annihilation of European Jewry was refined and perfected. It is where four gas chambers and four crematoria annihilated more than a million Jews. It is the place where the notorious SS Doctor Josef Mengele conducted cruel medical experiments on people. It is also the place where thousands upon thousands of Poles, Roma and Sinti and Soviet prisoners of war were brutally murdered alongside the Jewish victims. We owe it to all of them, and to the survivors, to make sure that today's anti-Semites and hatemongers – those who want to destroy the Jewish people and its only refugee, the Jewish nation state Israel – will not get another go at it.

On January 28, 2017, WJC President Lauder defended a statement made by President Donald Trump on the occasion of International Holocaust Remembrance Day that had generated controversy for failing to mention that the victims of the Holocaust were Jewish. In response to Anti-Defamation League director Jonathan Greenblatt's criticism of the statement, Lauder dismissed concern for remembering the Jewish identities of the victims of the Holocaust as "manufactured controversies".

Since September 2019 the World Jewish Congress receives Austrian Holocaust Memorial Servants from the Gedenkdienst program, founded in 1992 by Dr. Andreas Maislinger, from the Austrian Service Abroad.

== Restitution of Jewish assets ==
Since the end of World War II, the WJC has pressed governments and private enterprises to return seized or looted Jewish assets to their rightful owners. It was instrumental in concluding agreements with a number of European countries.

See above: Restitution of Holocaust-era assets and compensation payments

In its policy guidelines the WJC states that negotiations on Holocaust-era assets are "conducted in the framework of the World Jewish Restitution Organization in coordination with the Israeli government and with the support of the US government and the European Union."

The organization emphasizes that "the distribution of any compensation monies should not be handled by the WJC. The WJC does not seek any form of commission or gratification payments from Holocaust-era compensation or restitution agreements." WJC leaders have in particular urged the Polish government to come up with a restitution law for looted private properties, but Warsaw in March 2011 announced that this was impossible due to the current economic situation.

=== Fighting Holocaust denial, revisionism and glorification of the Nazis ===
On repeated occasions, the WJC has urged countries to ensure that Holocaust denial is publicly condemned and fought. WJC officials have been critical of a rise of marches in a number of European countries including Hungary and Serbia by WWII Nazi veterans, far-right extremists and neo-Nazis who publicly glorify the Hitler regime and espouse anti-Semitic ideology.

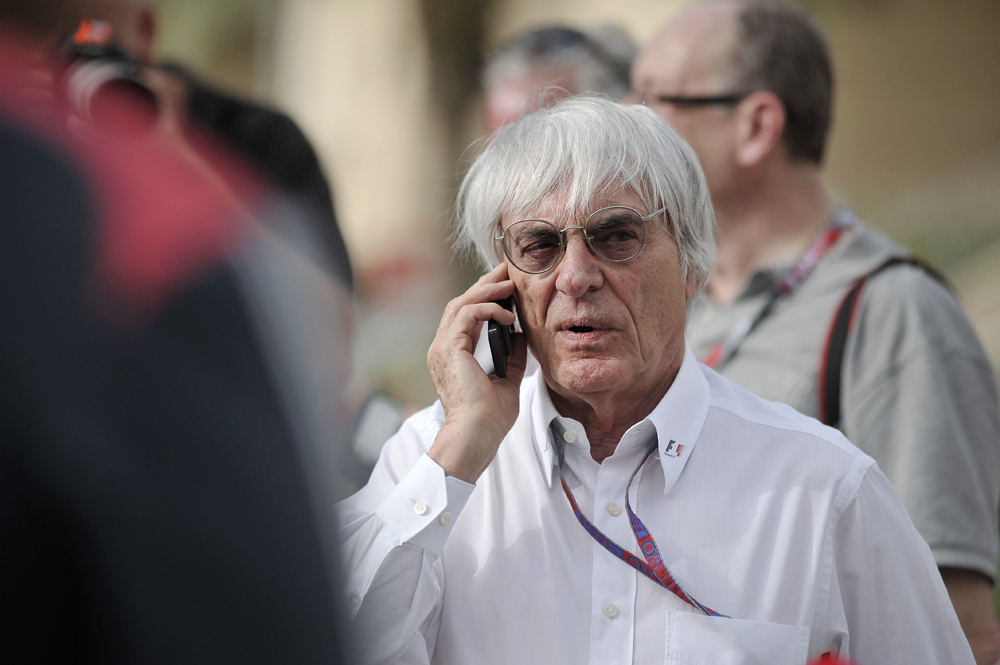
Bernie Ecclestone

In July 2009, Bernie Ecclestone faced calls from WJC President Ronald S. Lauder to resign as Formula One chief after he had praised Adolf Hitler in a newspaper interview and said that Hitler "got things done." Lauder said someone with Ecclestone's views should not be allowed to run such an important and popular racing series. He urged Formula One teams, drivers and host countries to suspend their cooperation with him. In reaction, Ecclestone told the news agency Associated Press that "I think the people who are saying that haven't got the power to say these things." Asked if the WJC was influential, Ecclestone said: "It's a pity they didn't sort the banks out" and "They have a lot of influence everywhere." After a public outcry, Ecclestone apologized for his remarks and said he had "been an idiot."

The WJC also criticized the US internet retailer Amazon.com for selling 'I love Hitler' T-shirts and similar merchandise praising senior Nazi officials. The items were later removed from the website.

In February 2012, the WJC attacked the German Federal Constitutional Court for a ruling which acquitted a Holocaust denier. WJC Vice-president Charlotte Knobloch called the verdict "quirky" and said that it cast a damning light on the legal proceedings. She accused the highest German court of disposing of Germany's law that makes the denial of the Shoah a crime "through the backdoor".

Following an interview with Iranian President Mahmoud Ahmadinejad on German public television in which he repeatedly called Israel "an artificial state" that had been built on the "lie of the Holocaust", Knobloch called on the German government to publicly condemn the Iranian leader's statements and to isolate Iran diplomatically.

Standing alone amongst all major Jewish organizations, World Jewish Congress President Ronald Lauder backed Donald Trump's decision to omit any mention of Jews in his 2017 Holocaust commemoration statement. Lauder contended that other Jewish groups were "play[ing] politics" and engaging in "manufactured outrages" that distracted from "real" instances of anti-Semitic threats. The WJC also publicly backed David M. Friedman as President Trump's nominee for ambassador to Israel, in spite of critics who accused Friedman of trivializing the gravity of the Holocaust by comparing Jewish members of the liberal pro-Israel group J Street to "kapos", or Nazi collaborators.

== Prosecution of Nazi war criminals ==
The World Jewish Congress has repeatedly called for the prosecution of presumed Nazi war criminals. WJC President Ronald S. Lauder said in 2011: "There must never be impunity or closure for those who were involved in mass murder and genocide, irrespective of their age". The WJC would persist in its efforts to bring the "few old men out there who have the blood of innocent Shoah victims on their hands" before courts of law, to be tried and held accountable for their actions.

In 2009, WJC officials called for the extradition Ukrainian-born John Demjanjuk from the United States to Germany, where he was wanted on charges of aiding to kill at least 27,900 Jews at the Sobibor death camp during World War II. Demjanjuk's trial and conviction by a Munich court in May 2011 was hailed by the organization. It declared: "Belatedly, justice has now been done, and the family members of those who were brutally murdered in Sobibor will certainly welcome this verdict."

In December 2010, Lauder publicly urged Serbia to extradite Peter Egner to the United States where he was wanted to stand trial for serving in a Nazi unit during World War II that murdered 17,000 Jews. Egner died in January 2011.

== Fighting anti-Semitism ==
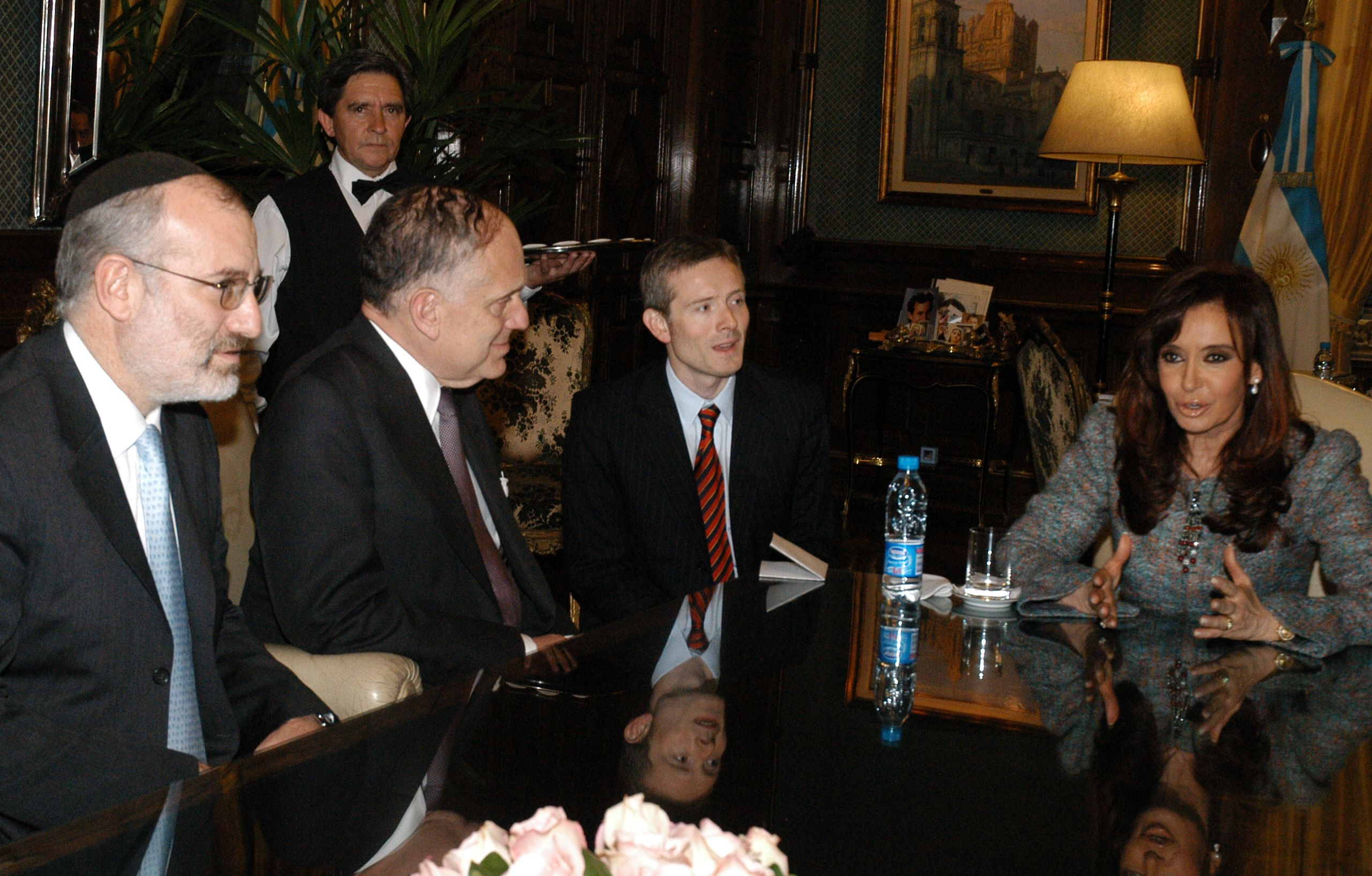
Eduardo Elsztain and Ronald S. Lauder with Argentine President Cristina Fernández de Kirchner in Buenos Aires, June 2008

One of the principal activities of the World Jewish Congress has been to fight anti-Semitism in all its forms. Its stated policy on this issue is: "Governments and international organizations need to provide adequate resources for the fight against hatred, notably by providing security to Jewish communities and by improving education. Laws against anti-Semitism and other forms of racism need to be adopted and enforced properly in every country. All forms and expressions of neo-Nazism, xenophobia and intolerance are unacceptable and have to be condemned, and the full force of the law needs to be applied to those who are a danger to democracy liberty and Jewish communities. Marches by extremist, anti-Semitic groups should be banned where national laws provide for such a possibility. Governments and political leaders should condemn such events and work together with local Jewish communities."

In an opinion article entitled "Sweden's Shame", in 2010, WJC President Ronald S. Lauder attacked the Swedish government, church officials and media for "fanning the flames" of hatred against Jews.

In May 2012, Lauder condemned as "despicable" remarks made by the Norwegian sociologist Johan Galtung who had "revived anti-Semitic canards such as Jewish control of the media" and suggested that Israel's Mossad could have been behind the 2011 "massacres in Norway committed by Anders Breivik" in which 77 people died. Lauder declared: "There is a growing tendency to blame the Jews for all evil that happens under the sun. It is a scandal that a leading academics such as Galtung does not shy away from citing notorious forgeries such as the Protocols of the Elders of Zion to support his bigoted arguments."

In August 2012, the WJC president criticized Austrian politicians for failing to publicly denounce the leader of the third-largest political party in the country, the FPÖ, Heinz-Christian Strache, who had posted an anti-Semitic cartoon on his Facebook page. "Clearly, and not for the first time, the FPÖ leader is trying to whip up anti-Semitic sentiment. His repeated denials are not credible because his words and actions speak for themselves," Ronald Lauder said in a statement, adding: "This scandal shows that anti-Jewish resentment is still widespread, and unscrupulous politicians are allowed to exploit it for electioneering purposes. That is mind-boggling, and it could have negative repercussions for Austrian Jews."

In 2013, Budapest, Hungary was chosen as a location for the 14th Plenary Assembly because of concerns over the rise of anti-Semitism in that country. Péter Feldmájer, president of the Federation of Jewish Communities in Hungary, stated this was "a symbol of solidarity with our Jewish community, which has been faced with growing anti-Semitism in recent years". In his speech at the opening dinner, in the presence of Hungarian Prime Minister Viktor Orbán, WJC President Ronald S. Lauder lambasted a series of recent anti-Semitic and racist incidents in Hungary. He particularly mentioned Zsolt Bayer, who had penned a newspaper column referring to Roma as "cowardly, repulsive, noxious animals" that are "unfit to live among people" and "shouldn't be allowed to exist." Lauder said "such words are reminiscent of the darkest era in European history" and concluded that "Hungary's international reputation has suffered in recent years" not because it was being "smeared by the foreign press" but rather due to extremists in the Jobbik party. "Jobbik is dragging the good name of Hungary through the mud," Lauder said. On the eve of the WJC assembly in Budapest, about 700 Jobbik supporters held a demonstration in downtown Budapest where they railed against "Zionists who had subjugated the indigenous people of Hungary."

In his speech to WJC delegates, Orbán condemned the rise in anti-Semitism in Hungary and in Europe more widely. He called it a danger that "threatens even us Christians" and voiced determination to stamp it out. The WJC said in reaction that Orbán had not confronted the true nature of the problem. "We regret that Mr. Orbán did not address any recent anti-Semitic or racist incidents in the country, nor did he provide sufficient reassurance that a clear line has been drawn between his government and the far-right fringe," a WJC spokesman said afterwards.

=== Hatred on the internet ===
The World Jewish Congress has also urged internet companies, including social media giants such as Google, to act against Holocaust denial, hate speech and anti-Jewish incitement on their platforms. A survey published by the WJC in 2017 revealed that "More than 382,000 anti-Semitic posts were uploaded to social media in 2016, an average of one post every 83 seconds", which WJC CEO R. Robert Singer said revealed "how alarming the situation really is."

Previously, the organization had urged the German branch of YouTube of tolerating clips of neo-Nazi rock bands on its platform that were illegal in Germany. In an opinion piece for the Los Angeles Times, Singer also accused the internet retailer Amazon.com of offering books that glorify the Holocaust. The WJC CEO wrote that Amazon customers "can buy a plethora of Holocaust-denying literature, swastika pendants and other Nazi memorabilia. While books are clearly different from doormats or flags, they still violate Amazon's guidelines, not to mention common decency."

=== Dialogue with other religions ===
The WJC believes that the three Abrahamic faiths (Judaism, Christianity and Islam) can cooperate "to respond to the challenges posed by developments in modern society, especially to discuss and promote shared values."

== Jewish–Christian dialogue ==
Inter-religious dialogue between Jews and Christians started in the 1940s, notably with the establishment of the International Council of Christians and Jews in Switzerland in 1947. The WJC has managed to establish good relations with the Catholic Church, especially since the Second Vatican Council and the Declaration Nostra aetate in 1965. Progress, however, is slow with regard to the Orthodox and Protestant Churches, which according to the WJC is mainly due to the decentralized nature of these churches and certain political issues related to the Middle East conflict.

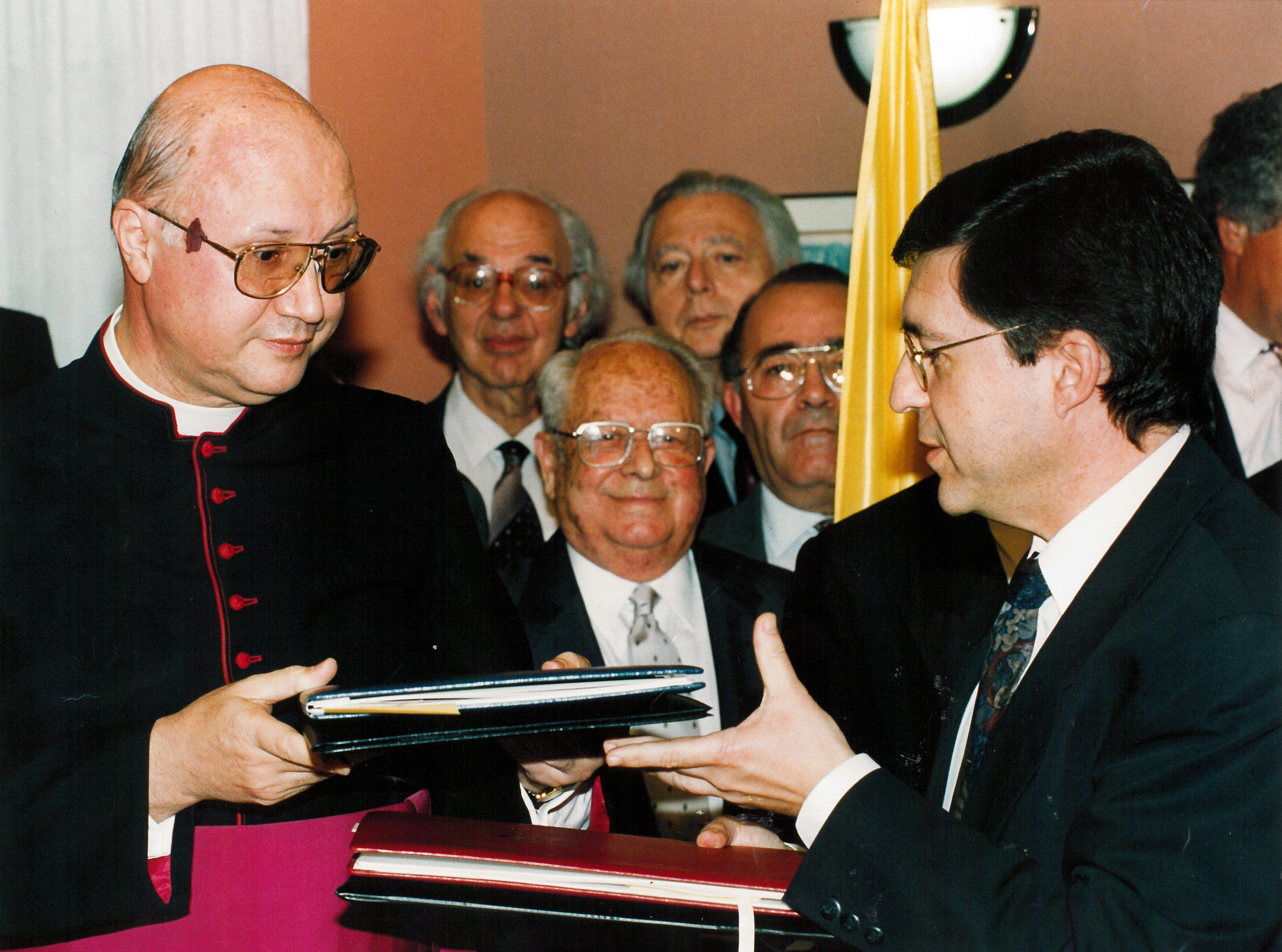
World Jewish Congress leader Gerhart M. Riegner (center) witnesses formal establishment of diplomatic relations between the Holy See, represented by Monsignor Claudio Maria Celli (left), and the State of Israel, represented by Deputy Foreign Minister Yossi Beilin, December 1993

Since 1945, WJC leaders have been received by Catholic pontiffs a number of times. Pope Pius XII received WJC Secretary General A. Leon Kubowitzki in private audience in 1945. Pope Paul VI met WJC President Nahum Goldmann in 1969 and WJC Secretary General Gerhart Riegner in 1975. In 1979, Philip Klutznick met with Pope John Paul II, and Klutznick's successor Edgar Bronfman Sr. was received by John Paul II in 1992 and 2003. Bronfman led a delegation of Jewish leaders for a meeting with Pope Benedict XVI in June 2005, and his successor Ronald S. Lauder was received by Benedict XVI in October 2007, December 2010 and May 2012. Pope Francis received a delegation of the International Jewish Committee on Interreligious Consultations, including several members of the WJC, in June 2013.

On his election as new Catholic pontiff, Ronald Lauder called Cardinal Jorge Mario Bergoglio "an experienced man, someone who is known for his open-mindedness ... a man of dialogue, a man who is able to build bridges with other faiths".

The organization was instrumental in the creation inter-faith bodies such as the International Jewish Committee of Inter-religious Consultations (IJCIC), and it has actively participated in the International Catholic-Jewish Liaison Committee (ILC). The WJC also contributed to the establishment of diplomatic relations between the State of Israel and the Holy See in the 1990s.

During the 1980s, the WJC persuaded Pope John II to come out in favor of the removal of a convent of Carmelite nuns which had opened near the site of the former Nazi death camp Auschwitz.

The role of the Vatican during the Holocaust remains a controversial issue and has repeatedly flared up. The beatification and possible canonization of Pope Pius XII was criticized by WJC President Ronald S. Lauder, who said that all Vatican archives on the period should be made accessible to scholars. "There are strong concerns about Pope Pius XII's political role during World War II which should not be ignored," Lauder declared in a statement.

In February 2009, Lauder and the WJC were highly critical of the Vatican's decision to revoke the excommunication of Bishop Richard Williamson, a senior member of the dissident Catholic group Society of St. Pius X. Williamson, in an interview with Swedish television, had denied the existence of gas chambers in Nazi concentration camps. Lauder said: "The Vatican was badly advised to revoke the excommunication of the four bishops ... Therefore, we call on Pope Benedict XVI to urgently address these concerns and to ensure that the achievements of four decades of Catholic-Jewish dialogue are not being damaged by a small minority of people who want to divide rather than unite." Lauder later praised Benedict XVI for writing a personal letter to Catholic bishops in which the Pope explained himself. "The Pope has found clear and unequivocal words regarding Bishop Williamson's Holocaust denial, and he deserves praise for admitting that mistakes were made within the Vatican in the handling of this affair," the WJC president was quoted as saying.

In 2010, Ronald S. Lauder was also critical of the continued use of the Good Friday Prayer for the Jews in church liturgy. In an op-ed for the Italian newspaper Corriere della Sera, the WJC president wrote: "When the Pope allows the use of the Good Friday Prayer of the old Tridentine liturgy, which calls for Jews to acknowledge Jesus Christ as the Savior of all men, some of us are deeply hurt."

== Dialogue with Islam ==
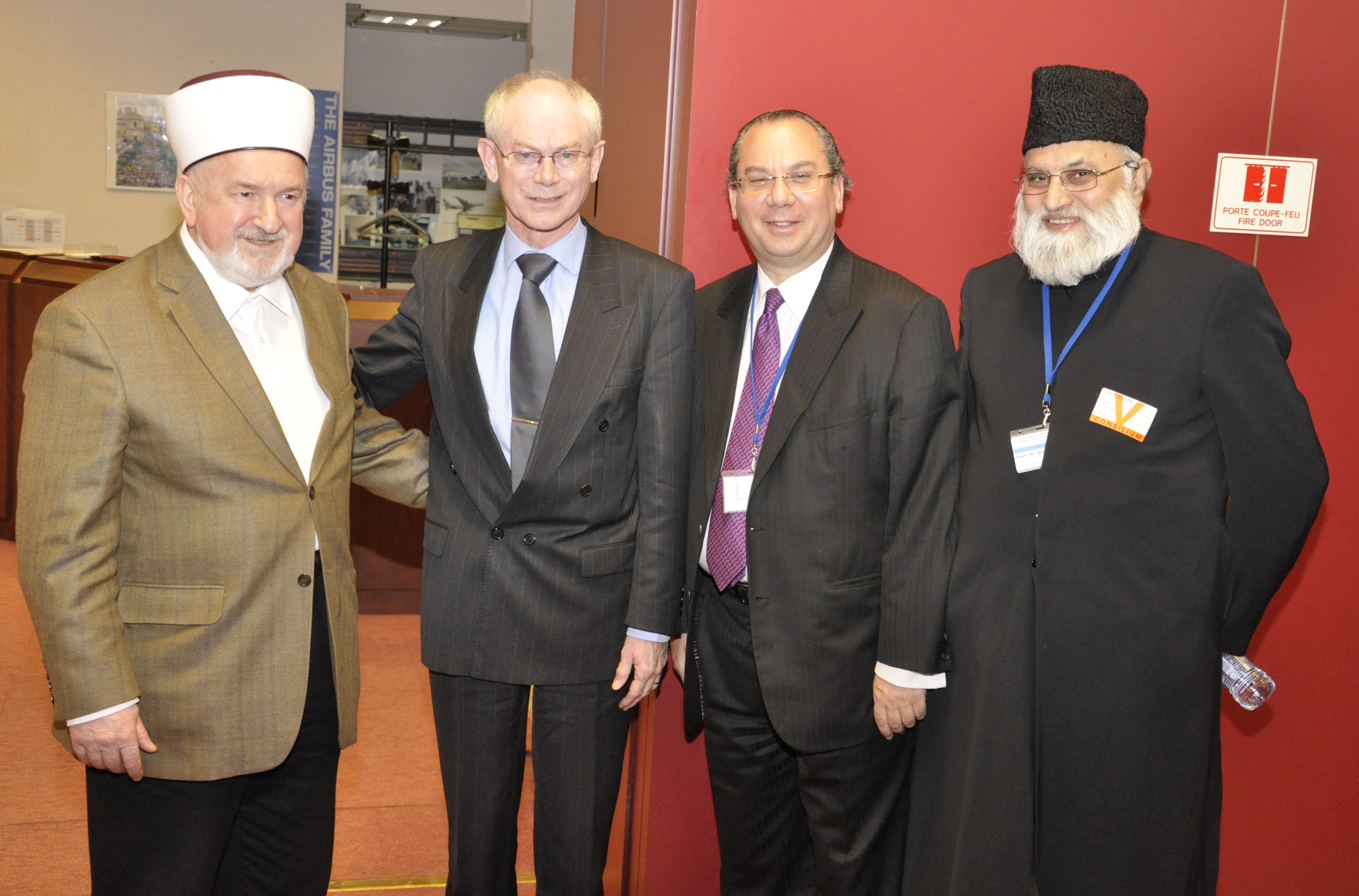
Bosnia's Grand Mufti Mustafa Ceric, European Council President Herman Van Rompuy, WJC Vice-president Rabbi Marc Schneier, and British Imam Abdujalil Sajid in Brussels, December 2010

The World Jewish Congress considers dialogue with representatives of moderate Islam as "one of the most important and challenging issues at this time. The increasing gap of understanding between so-called Western liberal democracies and the Islamic world is extremely dangerous," according to the WJC website.

In 2008, WJC leaders met with King Abdullah of Saudi Arabia at an inter-faith conference in the Spanish capital Madrid. Later that year, WJC President Ronald S. Lauder also called on the Saudi monarch in New York. In December 2011, WJC Vice-president Marc Schneier was received by King Hamad of Bahrain at the royal palace in Manama.

The World Jewish Congress also co-hosted a gathering of European Muslim and Jewish leaders in Brussels in December 2010, which included meetings with senior European Union officials. On that occasion, WJC Vice-president Marc Schneier declared: "We have hopefully kick-started a movement that will spread across Europe. The recipe really is quite simple: our two communities must focus more on what unites us than what separates us. We also must restrain the radicals within our own ranks and make sure they don't gain the upper hand."

In a speech in London in 2010, Schneier praised leaders of the Al-Azhar University in Cairo, considered the oldest center of Islamic scholarship in the world, for opening up inter-religious dialogue to the Jews. He declared: "This is a landmark decision, and Al-Azhar deserves praise for it. Coming from the leading center of Islamic thinking in the world, it will be enormously helpful for all moderate forces within Islam. [ ... ] Leaders from both sides should now seize the opportunity and take Jewish-Muslim relations to the next level. Both communities have a lot more in common, and to give to the other side, than many people think."

== Pluralistic Israel ==
In August 2018, WJC President Ronald S. Lauder called on "Israel's government to listen to the voices of protest and outrage" and uphold the country's democratic and egalitarian principles against the threat of dominance by restrictive Orthodox influence, from what he called 'a radical minority'.

=== Iran ===
Since the Islamic revolution in 1979, and in particular following the terrorist attacks against the Israeli Embassy in Buenos Aires in February 1992 and the AMIA Jewish center in Buenos Aires in July 1994, in which over 100 people were killed and which Iran's leadership was accused of having masterminded, the World Jewish Congress has been vocal in denouncing what it calls the "Iranian threat".

In 1995, then WJC President Edgar Bronfman Sr. was reportedly instrumental in blocking a planned deal by the DuPont-owned US oil firm Conoco with Iran. Bronfman was a member of the DuPont board of directors. The deal would have been the first major investment by an oil company in Iran since 1979, when the United States broke off trade with the country after the seizure of the US Embassy in Teheran by Islamic militants. Two months later, the WJC publicly welcomed a decision by US President Bill Clinton to impose a trade embargo on Iran. "We applaud President Clinton's decisive blow against terrorism," declared WJC Executive Director Elan Steinberg. In 2006, after prosecutors in Argentina asked a judge to order the arrest of a former Iranian President Akbar Hashemi Rafsanjani and other members of his government in connection with the AMIA bombing, Bronfman said that "Iran is a state sponsor of terrorism", adding that "the entire international community has a moral responsibility to ensure that Iran is held accountable for its terrorist actions."

The WJC lobbied for the issuing of Red Notices by Interpol against the Iranian suspects in the bombing case, which were approved by the Interpol General Assembly in November 2007. On the 18th anniversary of the AMIA bombing in July 2012, WJC President Lauder declared: "The Iranian regime has blood on its hands, not only by suppressing dissent at home but also by sponsoring terrorism world-wide. What the world saw 18 years ago in Buenos Aires it can still see today, be it in Syria, in Lebanon or in other places."

In a 2010 resolution on Iran, the WJC expressed support for international condemnation of current Iranian President Mahmoud Ahmadinejad's repeated calls for the abolition of the State of Israel and his statements questioning the Holocaust. The organization resolved "to make the four-fold threat (the nuclear threat; the threat of genocidal incitement; international state sponsored terrorism; and the systematic and widespread violations of the human and civil rights of the Iranian people) that the current Iranian regime poses to international peace and stability, a high strategic priority of the WJC."

In 2006, the WJC launched the Iran Update, "a comprehensive weekly publication disseminated via the internet to most members of the US Congress and government, United Nations missions, foreign diplomats, European Union officials, and Israeli policymakers, in addition to Jewish communities worldwide." The publication focused on exposing Iran's ongoing pursuit of a nuclear capability, domestic Iranian politics, Iranian foreign policy in the Middle East and internationally, Israeli policy vis-à-vis Iran and the efforts of worldwide Jewish communities in combating Iranian Holocaust-denial and nuclear proliferation.

Further to the WJC's and other international organizations' calls, representatives of many Western countries either did not show up or walked out of the conference chamber when Iranian President Ahmadinejad attacked Israel in his speech to the Durban Review Conference in Geneva in April 2009 and to the United Nations General Assembly meeting in New York in September 2009. The WJC has repeatedly run campaigns accusing Iran of deceiving the international community and calling Ahmadinejad "the world's foremost hatemonger".

In 2008, WJC President Ronald S. Lauder criticized a visit by Swiss Foreign Minister Micheline Calmy-Rey to Tehran, where she met with Ahmadinejad mainly to help a Swiss company secure a multibillion-dollar contract to buy natural gas from Iran. Lauder told a press conference in Bern: "Maybe that money that Switzerland is paying to Iran will some day be used to either buy weapons to kill Israelis, or buy weapons to kill Americans, or buy missiles to be able to deliver nuclear weapons."

Lauder also led diplomatic efforts to persuade European businesses to withdraw from Iran. In January 2010, he warmly welcomed the announcement by Siemens CEO Peter Löscher that his company would not seek new business in Iran.

The WJC has repeatedly urged the international community to do more to bring to justice the masterminds of the terrorist attacks against Israel's embassy and AMIA Jewish community center in Buenos Aires in the 1990s, which Argentinean prosecutors have said were carried out at the instigation of senior Iranian officials.

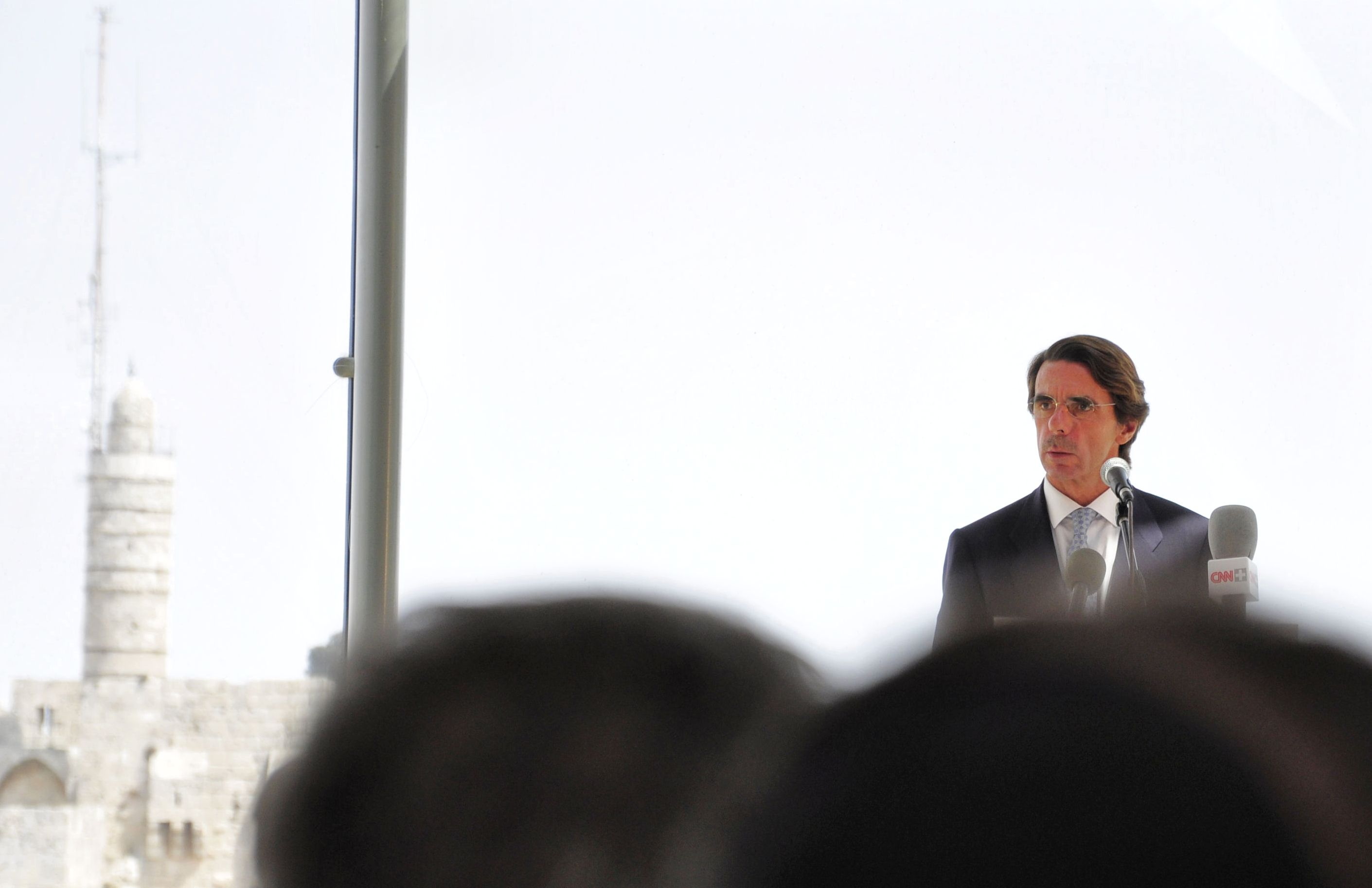
Former Spanish Prime Minister Jose Maria Aznar addressing a meeting of the World Jewish Congress in Jerusalem, September 2010

In July 2011, Olympic news outlet Around the Rings reported that World Jewish Congress president Ronald S. Lauder had issued a statement urging IOC officials to ban Iran from participating in the Olympic Games, citing Iranian athletes' refusal to compete against Israeli athletes. "It is high time that a strong signal is sent to Iran that unless this long-standing boycott is lifted, Iranian athletes will not be allowed to enter major international events such as next year's Olympic Games in London", Lauder said. The WJC reiterated its position when in May 2012 Iranian President Ahmadinejad announced plans to attend the London Olympics. Ahmadinejad has "no business" attending the London Olympic Games this summer, the Jewish Chronicle quoted a World Jewish Congress spokesman as saying.

== Jewish refugees from Arab countries ==
The issue of Jewish refugees from Arab lands continues to be on the World Jewish Congress agenda today. The WJC website states that "The plight of Jews who fled from, or still live in, Arab lands and their specific concerns are not well-known and need to be raised with governments and international organizations. Where illegal seizure of assets took place, these should be returned to their former owners, or adequate compensation should be paid. Jews remaining in Arab lands, as well as other religious minorities, should be granted religious freedom and allowed to practice their faith according to their traditions. Jewish communal sites in Arab countries must be preserved and respected." The WJC believes that the plight of the Jewish refugees from Arab lands has been neglected for decades by the international community, including governments and international organizations.

In September 2012, the WJC co-hosted two conferences on the issue, together with the Israeli government. They were held in Jerusalem and at the United Nations headquarters in New York, respectively. The aim was to raise the profile of the issue and enlist international support. In a speech to the New York symposium, WJC President Ronald S. Lauder urged the world to recognize the suffering of Jewish refugees. "Now is the time to set the historical, diplomatic and legal record straight. Lasting peace can only be built on historical facts – both the issues of the Jewish refugees and the Palestinian refugees must be addressed." Lauder said that "only addressing the historical facts" could help to bring about peace. At the Jerusalem conference, a joint declaration was adopted calling on the United Nations to place the issue of Jewish refugees on its agenda and that of its affiliated forums.

Palestinian critics derided the move to raise this issue now as a "manipulative strategy". It was "part of a public relations campaign that is both cynical and hypocritical", PLO Executive member Hanan Ashrawi told the newspaper USA Today.

Following the conferences, Israel's Foreign Minister Avigdor Lieberman instructed Israeli diplomats around the world to raise the matter in all official government meetings and with parliamentarians. According to figures provided by the Israeli Foreign Ministry, approximately 850,000 Jews from Arab states across the Middle East left their native countries following the establishment of the State of Israel in 1948 due to state-sponsored persecution. Most of them were forced to abandon their property and possessions, the ministry said.

== Other issues ==
In August 2008, World Jewish Congress and Venezuelan Jewish community leaders met in Caracas with Venezuelan President Hugo Chávez Frias. The meeting stirred some controversy in the Jewish world because of Chávez' public support for Iranian leader Mahmoud Ahmadinejad and his strong criticism of Israel. However, then WJC Secretary-General Michael Schneider defended the meeting with Chávez and said the WJC acted only on behalf of, and with the backing of, the Venezuelan Jewish community.

Following the exclusion of Israeli tennis player Shahar Peer from an ATP tournament in Dubai in February 2009, the WJC called for the "suspension of all sporting events in the [United Arab Emirates] until Israeli participants are admitted." The response of the women's and men's tours to the exclusion of Peer had been "faint-hearted," and they should have canceled the event immediately, WJC President Lauder was quoted by the news agency Bloomberg as saying.

Ahead of the 2012 Summer Olympics in London, the World Jewish Congress criticized the president of the International Olympic Committee, Jacques Rogge, for not agreeing to hold one minute's silence at the opening ceremony in remembrance of the eleven Israeli sportsmen killed by Palestinian terrorists during the Olympic Games in Munich in 1972. Ronald Lauder said Rogge's stance was "unfeeling" and "completely out of touch." He added: "Forty years after the saddest moment in Olympic history – when eleven Israeli athletes and sports officials and a German police officer were killed by Palestinian terrorists – it would have been an excellent opportunity to show to everyone that the sports world stands united against terrorism ... Nobody wants to 'politicize' the Olympic Games, as the IOC seems to suggest, but Baron Rogge and his colleagues on the IOC Executive have utterly failed – or refused – to grasp the importance of such a symbolic act."

In January 2019 WJC President Lauder, the Albanian Ambassador to the UN Besiana Kadare, and the United Nations Department of Global Communications co-hosted an event discussing the actions of Albanians who protected Jews during the Holocaust in Albania.

== Fundraising and finances ==
The WJC raises its funds mainly through the World Jewish Congress American Section, which is a non-profit body registered in the United States.

== Financial mismanagement ==
A series of allegations about the organization's accounting practices and "unusual" money transfers was raised in 2004 by Isi Leibler, then a vice-president of the WJC. It led to an investigation of the finances of the World Jewish Congress. A comprehensive audit of the WJC's accounts in Switzerland from 1995 to 2004, conducted by the accounting firm PricewaterhouseCoopers, reportedly found that "over the years $3.8 million 'disappeared' from the bank accounts" and that there were "significant un-reconciled cash withdrawals where there is no documentation of the usage of the funds." In January 2006, an investigation by the Office of the NY State Attorney General into the matter found no evidence of criminal conduct on the part of the WJC. Furthermore, the report of Attorney General Eliot Spitzer noted that the WJC had implemented all of his recommendations to improve financial oversight and management.

Spitzer's office identified financial mismanagement and breaches of fiduciary duty, but found no criminal wrongdoing and concluded that any misconduct "did not compromise the core mission" of the organization or result in "identifiable losses of charitable assets."

The report also highlighted several initiatives the WJC had taken since 2004 to improve financial management, including "the creation of an audit committee and the position of chief financial officer, the computerization of all financial records, the creation of an employee handbook outlining official procedures and policies, the implementation of travel and reimbursement procedures, and the creation of a new fund-raising entity (the WJC Foundation)."

Despite vigorously defending Israel Singer during the Attorney General's inquiry, in March 2007 Bronfman abruptly announced his firing. He accused Singer of "'help[ing] himself to cash from the WJC office, my cash." However, internal WJC documents seemed to suggest that a friction had developed between Singer and Bronfman over Singer's position on various internal WJC political matters, including the perception that he was insufficiently advocating the candidacy of Edgar Bronfman's son Matthew to the presidency of the WJC.

In May 2007, Bronfman stood down as the president of the WJC, having served in the post for 28 years.

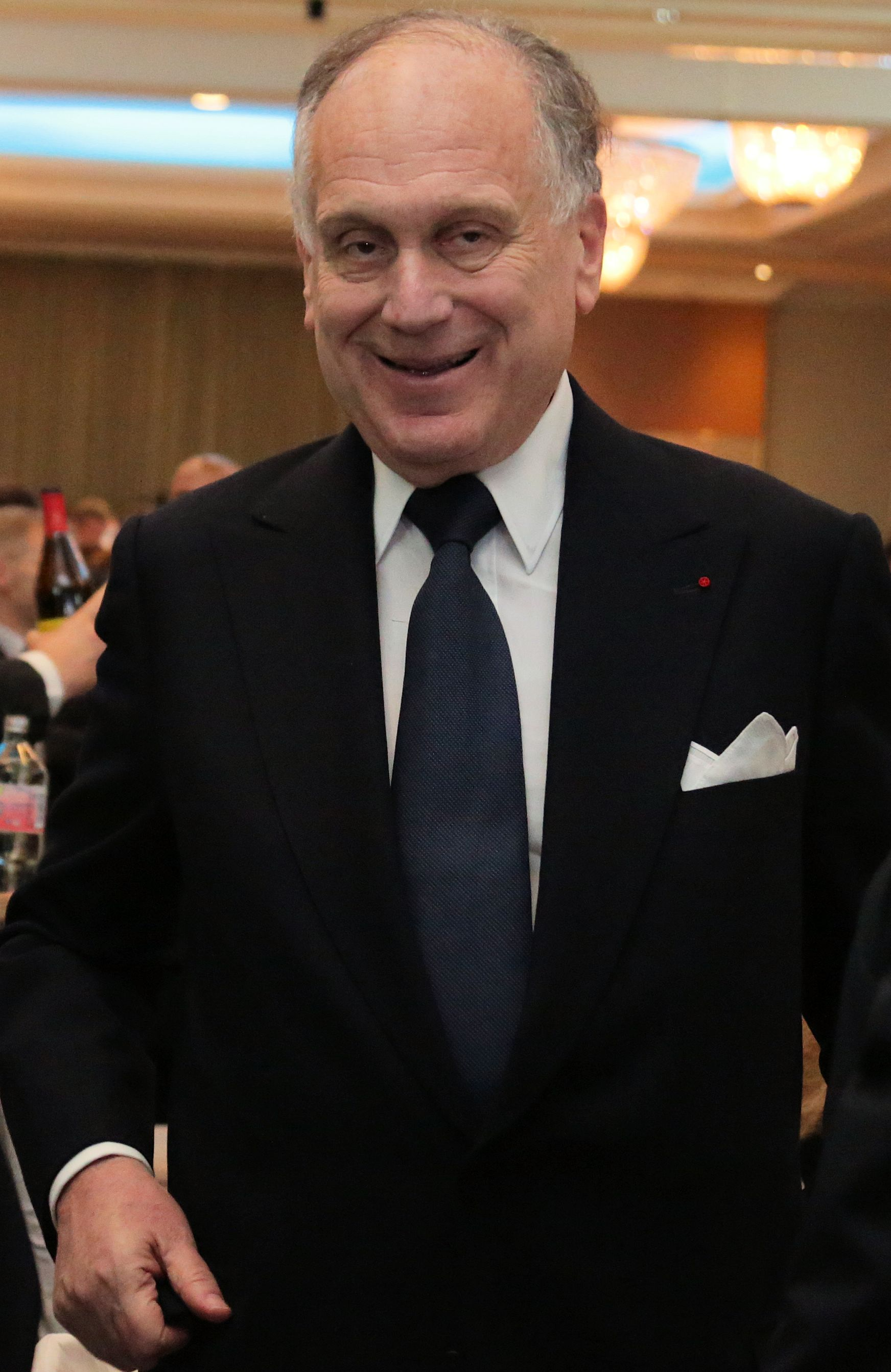
Current WJC President Ronald S. Lauder

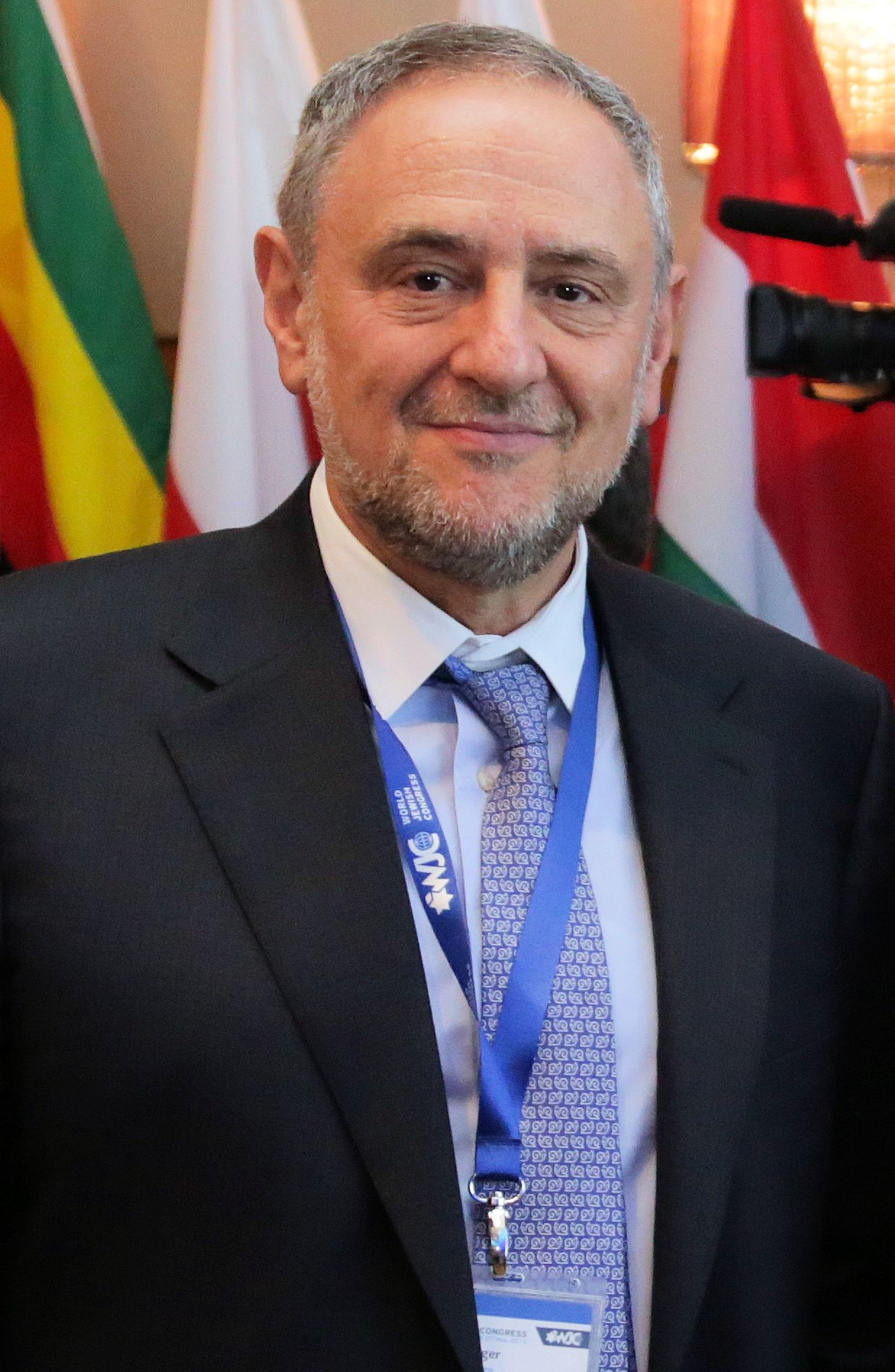
Former WJC CEO and Executive Vice-president Robert Singer

== Leadership ==
=== Presidents ===
- Julian Mack, honorary president (1936–43)
- Stephen S. Wise (1944–1949, 1936–1944: chairman of the Executive)
- Nahum Goldmann (1949–1977, acting to 1953)
- Philip Klutznick (1977–1979)
- Edgar Bronfman Sr. (1979–2007, acting to 1981)
- Ronald S. Lauder (2007–present, acting to 2009)

=== Secretaries-general ===
- Irving Miller (1936–1940)
- Arieh Tartakower (1940–1945)
- A. Leon Kubowitzki (1945–1948)
- Gerhart M. Riegner (1948–1983; coordinating director to 1959)
- Israel Singer (1983–2001; executive director to 1985)
- Avi Beker (2001–2003)
- Stephen E. Herbits (2005–2007)
- Michael Schneider (2007–2011)
- Dan Diker (2011–2012)
- Robert Singer (2013–2019) – Executive vice-president and chief executive officer

=== Major gatherings ===
==== Prior to 1936 ====
- First Preparatory Conference (Comité des Délégations Juives), 14–17 August 1932, Geneva, Switzerland
- Second Preparatory Conference (Comité des Délégations Juives), 5–8 September 1933, Geneva, Switzerland
- Third Preparatory Conference (Comité des Délégations Juives), 20–24 August 1934, Geneva, Switzerland

==== After 1936 ====
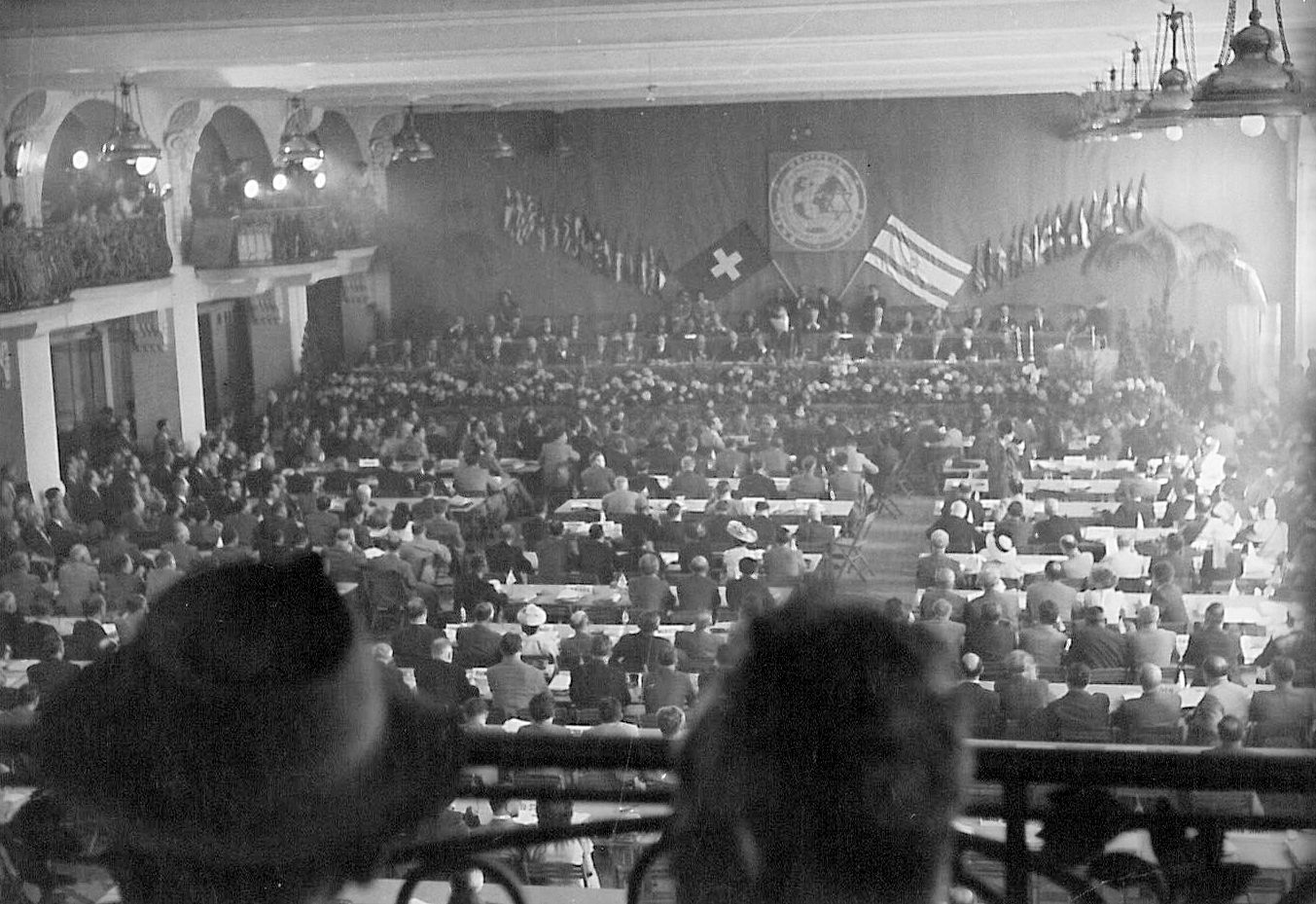
Delegates at the Second Plenary Assembly of the World Jewish Congress in Montreux, Switzerland

- First Plenary Assembly, 8–15 August 1936, Geneva, Switzerland
- War Emergency Conference, 26–30 November 1944, Atlantic City, USA (Election of Stephen S. Wise as WJC president)
- Second Plenary Assembly, 27 June – 6 July 1948, Montreux, Switzerland
- Third Plenary Assembly, 4–11 August 1953, Geneva, Switzerland (Election of Nahum Goldmann as WJC president)
- Fourth Plenary Assembly, 2–12 August 1959, Stockholm, Sweden
- Fifth Plenary Assembly, 31 July – 9 August 1966, Brussels, Belgium
- Sixth Plenary Assembly, 3–10 February 1975, Jerusalem
- Meeting of the General Council of the World Jewish Congress, 30 October – 3 November 1977, Washington DC, USA (Election of Philip Klutznick as WJC president)

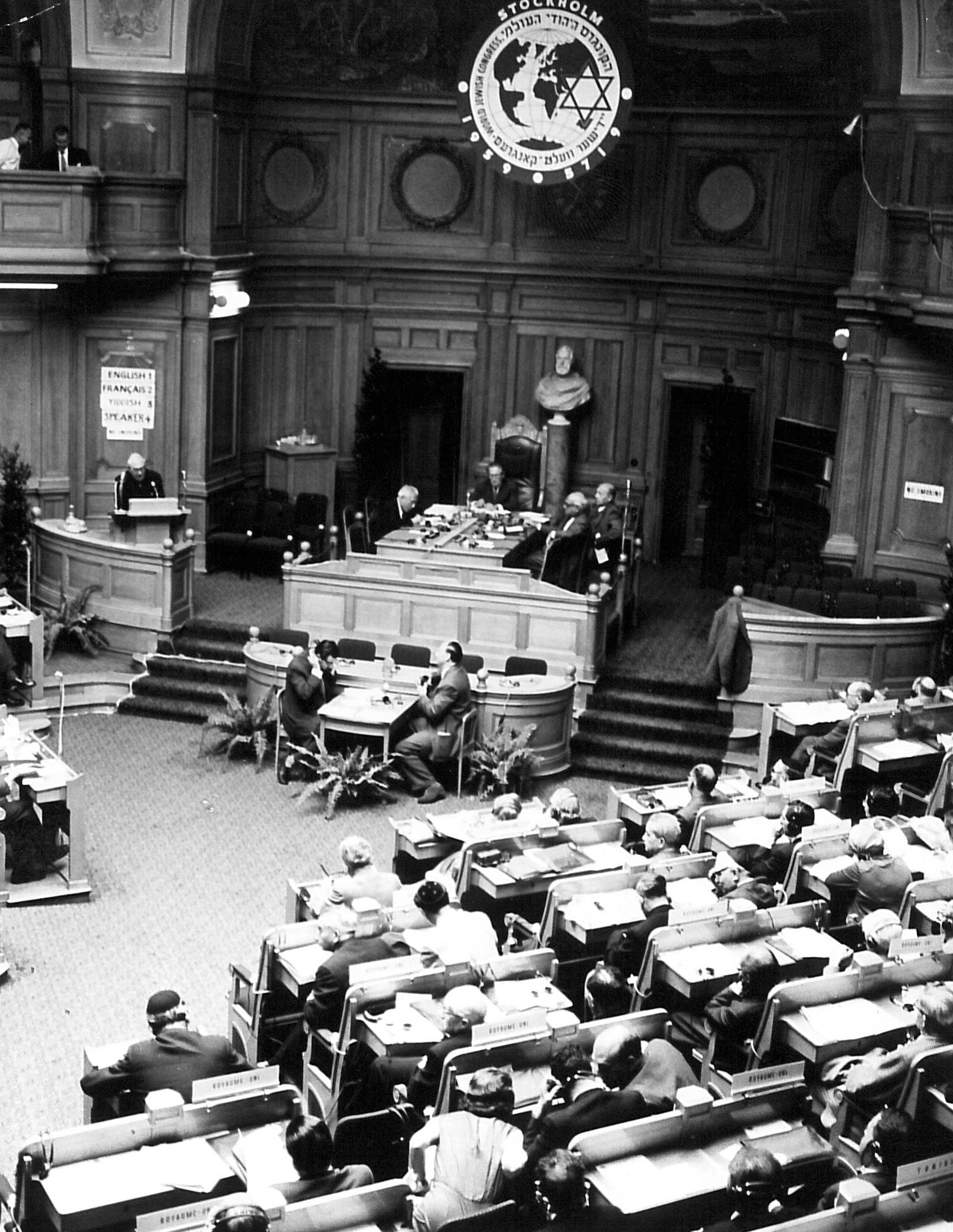
World Jewish Congress Plenary Assembly in Stockholm, Sweden, August 1959

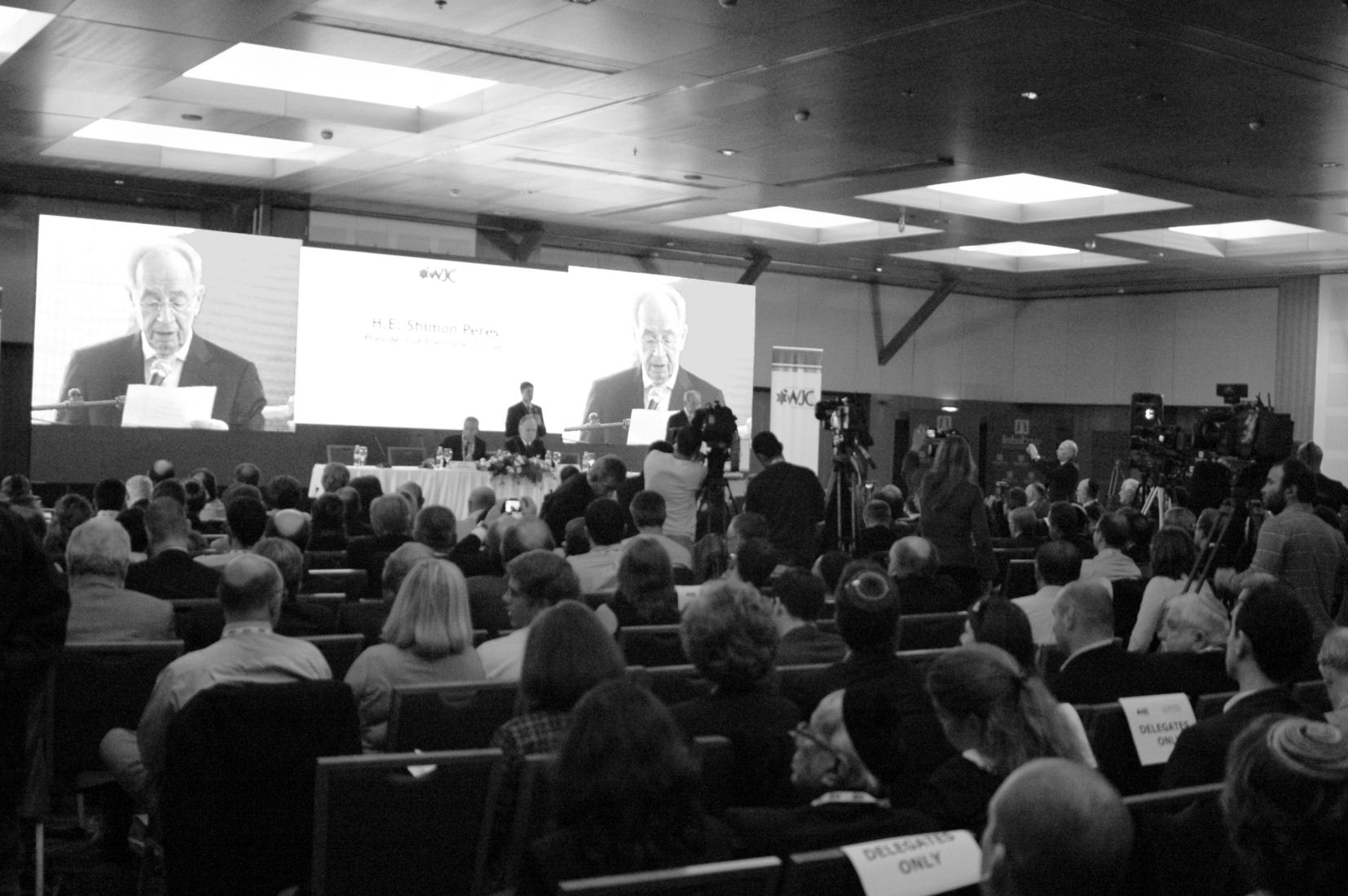
Israel's President Shimon Peres addressing the delegates of the 13th WJC Plenary Assembly in Jerusalem in January 2009

- Seventh Plenary Assembly, 18–22 January 1981, Jerusalem (Election of Edgar Bronfman Sr. as WJC president)
- Eighth Plenary Assembly (50th Anniversary Assembly), 27–30 January 1986, Jerusalem
- Ninth Plenary Assembly, 5–9 May 1991, Jerusalem
- 10th Plenary Assembly, 21–24 January 1996, Jerusalem
- 11th Plenary Assembly, 29 October–1 November 2001, Jerusalem
- 12th Plenary Assembly, 9–11 January 2005, Brussels, Belgium
- Governing Board Meeting, 10 June 2007, New York City, USA (Election of Ronald S. Lauder as WJC president)
- 13th Plenary Assembly, 26–27 January 2009, Jerusalem
- 14th Plenary Assembly, 5–7 May 2013, Budapest, Hungary
- Special Plenary Assembly, 15–17 March 2016, Buenos Aires, Argentina
- 15th Plenary Assembly, 23–25 April 2017, New York City, USA

=== List of member communities and organizations of the World Jewish Congress ===
(as approved by the 14th Plenary Assembly of the World Jewish Congress in 2013)

==== WJC member communities ====
- Argentina: Delegación de Asociaciones Israelitas Argentinas
- Armenia: Jewish Community in Armenia
- Aruba: Israelitische Gemeente Beth Israel
- Australia: Executive Council of Australian Jewry
- Austria: Bundesverband der Israelitischen Kultusgemeinden Österreichs
- Azerbaijan: Jewish Community of Azerbaijan
- Barbados: Jewish Community Council
- Belarus: Union of Belarusian Jewish Public Associations and Communities
- Belgium: Comité de coordination des organisations juives de Belgique (CCOJB)
- Bolivia: Círculo Israelita de La Paz
- Bosnia and Herzegovina: Jevrejska Zajednica Bosne i Hercegovine
- Botswana: Jewish Community of Botswana
- Brazil: Confederação Israelita do Brasil (CONIB)
- Bulgaria: Shalom – Association of Jews in Bulgaria
- Canada: Centre for Israel and Jewish Affairs
- Chile: Comunidad Judia de Chile
- Colombia: Confederación de Comunidades Judías de Colombia
- Costa Rica: Centro Israelita Sionista
- Croatia: Koordinacija židovskih općina u RH
- Cuba: Comunidad Hebrea de Cuba
- Curaçao: Mikve Israel
- Cyprus: Jewish Community of Cyprus
- Czech Republic: Federation of Jewish Communities in the Czech Republic
- Denmark: Det Mosaiske Troessamfund
- Dominican Republic: Centro Israelita de la República Dominicana
- Ecuador: Asociación Israelita de Quito
- Egypt: Jewish Community of Cairo
- El Salvador: Comunidad Israelita de El Salvador
- Estonia: Eesti Juudi Kogukond
- Finland: Suomen Juutalaisten Seurakuntien Keskusneuvosto
- France: Conseil Représentatif des Institutions juives de France (CRIF)
- Germany: Central Council of Jews in Germany (Zentralrat der Juden in Deutschland)
- Georgia: Jewish Community of Georgia
- Gibraltar: Managing Board of the Jewish Community of Gibraltar
- Greece: Central Board of Jewish Communities in Greece (KIS)
- Guatemala: Comunidad Judía de Guatemala
- Honduras: Comunidad Hebrea de Tegucigalpa
- Hong Kong: Jewish Community Centre Ltd.
- Hungary: Magyarországi Zsidó Hitközségek Szövetsége (Mazsihisz)
- India: Council of Indian Jewry
- Ireland: Jewish Representative Council of Ireland
- Israel: World Jewish Congress – Israel
- Italy: Unione delle Comunità Ebraiche Italiane
- Jamaica: United Congregation of Israelites
- Japan: Jewish Community of Japan
- Kazakhstan: Jewish Congress of Kazakhstan
- Kenya: Nairobi Hebrew Congregation
- Kyrgyzstan: Jewish Community of Kyrgyzstan
- Latvia: Council of Jewish Communities of Latvia
- Lesotho: Jewish Community of Lesotho
- Lithuania: Lietuvos žydų bendruomenė
- Luxembourg: Consistoire Israélite de Luxembourg
- Malta: Jewish Community of Malta
- Martinique: Association Cultuelle Israélite de la Martinique
- Mauritius: Island Hebrew Congregation
- Mexico: Comité Central de la Comunidad Judía de México (CCCJM)
- Moldova: Association of Jewish Communities and Organizations of Moldova
- Monaco: Association Cultuelle Israélite de Monaco
- Mongolia: Jewish Community of Mongolia
- Montenegro: Jevrejska zajednica Crne Gore
- Morocco: Conseil des Communautés Israélites du Maroc
- Mozambique: Mozambique Jewish Community
- Myanmar: Myanmar Jewish Community
- Namibia: Windhoek Hebrew Congregation
- Netherlands: Nederlands-Israëlitisch Kerkgenootschap (NIK)
- New Zealand: New Zealand Jewish Council
- Nicaragua: Congregación Israelita de Nicaragua
- North Macedonia: Evrejska zaednica vo Republika Makedonija
- Norway: Det Mosaiske Trossamfund
- Panama: Consejo Central Comunitario Hebreo de Panamá
- Paraguay: Comité Representativo Israelita de Paraguay
- Peru: Asociación Judía del Perú
- Philippines: Jewish Association of the Philippines
- Poland: Union of Jewish Religious Communities in Poland
- Portugal: Comunidade Israelita de Lisboa
- Romania: Federation of the Jewish Communities in Romania
- Russia: Russian Jewish Congress & VAAD of Russia
- Serbia: Federation of Jewish Communities in Serbia
- Singapore: Jewish Welfare Board
- Slovakia: Federation of Jewish Communities in Slovakia
- Slovenia: Jewish Community of Slovenia
- South Africa: South African Jewish Board of Deputies
- Spain: Federación de Comunidades Judías de España
- Suriname: Kerkeraad der Nederlands Portugees Israelitische Gemeente
- Sweden: Official Council of Swedish Jewish Communities
- Swaziland: Swaziland Jewish Community
- Switzerland: Schweizerischer Israelitischer Gemeindebund (SIG/FSCI)
- Tajikistan: Jewish Community of Tajikistan
- Thailand: Jewish Association of Thailand
- Tunisia: Communauté Juive de Tunisie
- Turkey: Jewish Community of Turkey
- Turkmenistan: Jewish Community of Turkmenistan
- Ukraine: Jewish Confederation of Ukraine
- United Kingdom: Board of Deputies of British Jews
- United States of America: WJC American Section
- Uruguay: Comité Central Israelita del Uruguay (CCIU)
- Uzbekistan: Jewish Community of Uzbekistan
- Venezuela: Confederación de las Asociaciones Israelitas de Venezuela (CAIV)
- Zambia: Council for Zambian Jewry
- Zimbabwe: Zimbabwe Jewish Board of Deputies

==== WJC member organizations ====
- African Jewish Congress
- Anti-Defamation League (ADL)
- B'nai B'rith International
- Conference of European Rabbis
- Hillel: The Foundation for Jewish Campus Life
- International Association of Jewish Lawyers and Jurists
- International Council of Jewish Women (ICJW)
- International Jewish Committee on Interreligious Consultations (IJCIC)
- Jewish Agency for Israel (JAFI)
- Jewish Diplomatic Corps
- Maccabi World Union
- Women's International Zionist Organization (WIZO)
- World ORT World Union
- World Mizrachi
- World Union for Progressive Judaism
- World Union of Jewish Students (WUJS)
- World Zionist Organization

== See also ==
- Claims Conference
- International Commission on Holocaust Era Insurance Claims
- Israel Council on Foreign Relations
- Reparations Agreement between Israel and West Germany
- Union of Jewish congregations of Latin America and the Caribbean
- World Jewish Congress lawsuit against Swiss Banks
