= Thomas Galati =

American law enforcement and intelligence officer

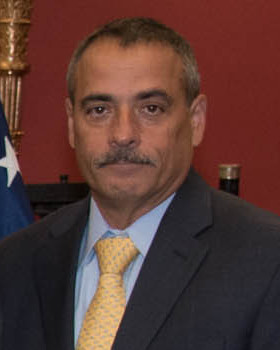

Deputy Commissioner of the Suffolk County Police Department
- Incumbent
- Assumed office October 3, 2025

Deputy Commissioner of NYPD Intelligence and Counterterrorism Bureau
- In office 2023 – April 22, 2023
- Preceded by: John Miller
- Succeeded by: Rebecca Weiner

Chief of NYPD Intelligence and Counterterrorism Bureau
- In office December 2, 2022 – 2023
- Deputy Commissioner: John Miller

Chief of the NYPD Intelligence Division
- In office 2013 – December 2, 2022
- Deputy Commissioner: John Miller

Assistant Chief of NYPD Intelligence Division
- In office 2008–2013
- Appointed by: Michael Bloomberg
- Deputy Commissioner: David Cohen

Deputy Chief of NYPD Gang Division
- In office ?

Personal details
- Education: State University of New York; Columbia University; Harvard University
- Awards: Medal of Valor; William and Naomi Gorowitz Institute on Terrorism and Extremism Service Award; AAPLE 2014 Robert Colangelo Award

Thomas P. Galati is an American law enforcement officer who serves as a Deputy Commissioner of the Suffolk County Police Department. Prior to his appointment at Suffolk, he worked for two years as the Senior Vice President of East Coast security operations for NBC Universal. Before that, he served with the New York City Police Department (NYPD) for over 39 years. He held nearly every rank during his tenure, retiring as the NYPD's Deputy Commissioner in charge of the Intelligence and Counterterrorism Bureau (ICB). Prior to that position, he served as the Chief of the ICB, and earlier as Chief of the ICB's Intelligence Division.

== Career in law enforcement ==
In 1989, Galati was awarded the Medal for Valor. During the mid-90's, as a Sergeant, he did have several Abuse of Authority claims against him substantiated by the review board.

Galati was on the job at the 47th Precinct during the September 11 attacks. Galati told Police Chief Magazine:

"...It was summertime, and it wasn’t even like you had a handkerchief or anything. I remember taking in a lot of dust and debris to the point where my eyes were just filled with it. I had to just push water into my eyes... The closer we came to the site, the less people there were. I was on Liberty and Church Street, and the ground was littered with all kinds of debris from the first tower—I vividly remember seeing a whole lot of shoes. Either people were blown out of their shoes, or ran out of them—they were everywhere... It was so hot where the building was that you couldn’t get close to it. You could literally walk over there and feel like you were walking into a fire.”

After the attacks, Galati pursued academic degrees and a career in the intelligence field. In 2006, joined the Intelligence Division, and by 2008, he was made its Assistant Chief.

In 2011, after traveling to Israel for departmental training on counterterrorism courses established by the Anti-Defamation League (ADL), he was awarded the William and Naomi Gorowitz Institute on Terrorism and Extremism Service Award.

Later in 2011, the existence of the controversial Demographics Unit (a unit of the ICB which spied on Muslims living along the Eastern Seaboard) was made known to the public in a series of Pulitzer Prize winning newspaper articles from the Associated Press. The following year, Galati gave testimony that he had "...never made a lead from rhetoric that came from a Demographics report..." His unsealed testimony became the first official description of that 8-man unit, and while he attempted to justify its potential, he also noted that its products had not been useful for his case work. By 2013, when Galati testified at the District Court for the Southern District of New York, the unit had been renamed the Zone Assessment Unit.

In 2016, the United States Equal Employment Opportunity Commission concluded after a 5-year study that Galati had held-back promotions for black officers working in the Intelligence Division's Enterprise Operations Unit (EOU), known more commonly as the "Rap Unit," for their undercover investigations in the city's rap industry. The report concluded that Galati held back these promotions in favor of his friends working in the Counterterrorism Unit. Two black detectives allegedly held back for promotion were Jon McCollum and Roland Stephens. In 2017, following up on that Commission study, the New York Times reported that being an "F.O.G." (Friend of Galati) was a sure path to promotion in the Intelligence Division. However, in an op-ed shortly afterward, Commissioner O'Neill disputed this claim, calling it "preposterous.". In 2019, McCollum and Stephens were awarded $700k in a lawsuit settlement.

== Dates of rank ==
=== New York City ===
- Recruit, 1984
- Rookie, 115 Precinct, July 1984
- Sergeant, December 1989
- Lieutenant, November 1996
- Captain, January 1999
- Deputy Inspector, August 2001
- Inspector, June 2003
- Deputy Chief, April 2004
- Assistant Chief, December 2008
- Chief, 2013
- Deputy Commissioner, 2023

=== Suffolk County ===
- Deputy Commissioner, 2025
