= Lower Manhattan Security Initiative =

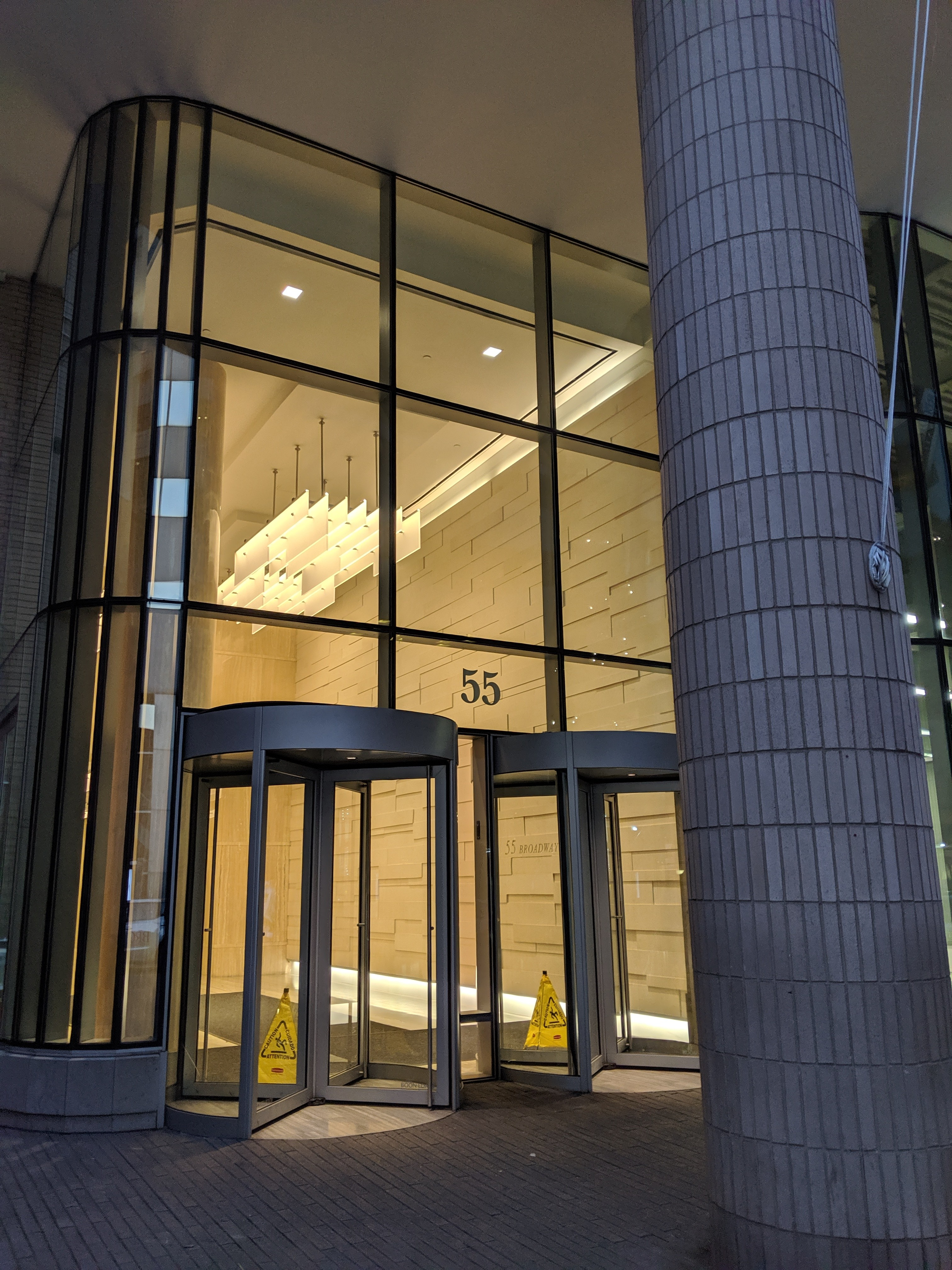
Street level view of 55 Broadway

The Lower Manhattan Security Initiative (LMSI) is a New York City Police Department initiative overseen by the Counterterrorism Bureau to increase surveillance efforts in Lower Manhattan, New York City, New York, United States. It is housed in the Lower Manhattan Security Coordination Center (LMSCC) located at 55 Broadway. The LMSI covers a 1.7-mile area from Canal Street to Battery Park, including the New York Stock Exchange, World Financial Center, former World Trade Center site, and numerous financial institutions.

== History ==
When the New York City Police Department launched the initiative in 2008, it aimed to install over 3,000 new security cameras in Lower Manhattan, as well as 100 automatic number plate recognition devices which are intended to scan plates and compare the numbers with information in a database. According to police spokesman Paul J. Browne, the footage from the cameras would be monitored from a center staffed by police officers and private employees. The activities the cameras are programmed to pick up on include the delivery of packages. For privately owned cameras, Scientific American reported in 2011 that the NYPD depends on private CCTV camera operators to manually control their cameras to point at significant elements in their environment, and the NYPD would cut into those dynamic feeds as needed. Other features of the system include mobile roadblocks, which could swivel into the streets and block traffic, and radiation detectors.

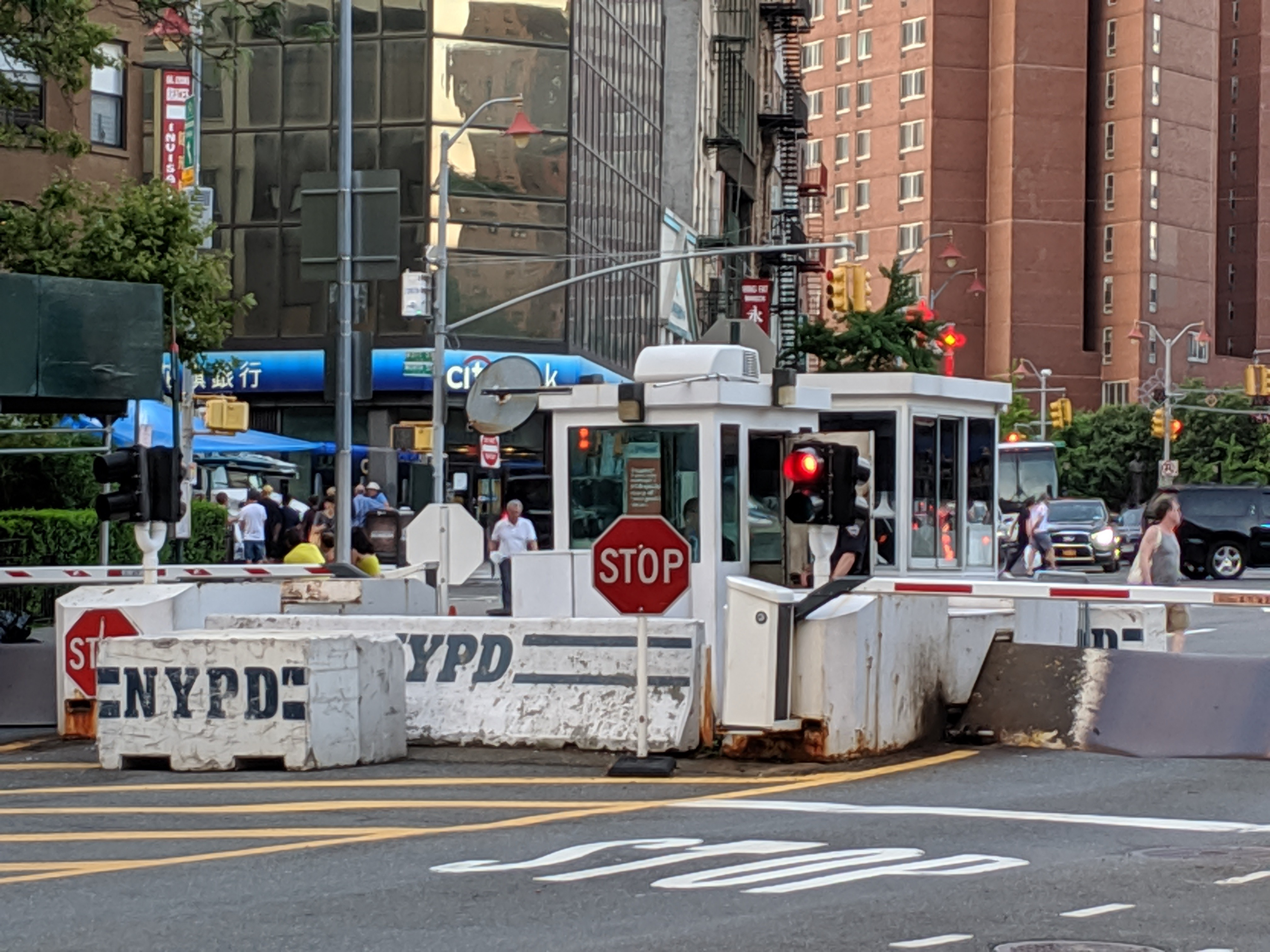
An NYPD mobile traffic barrier

Upon its initial proposal in 2007, the estimated cost of the LMSI was around $US 90 million (excluding the cost of radiation detectors), with the Department of Homeland Security paying for 10 million of this, and the city government covering 15 million.

In 2009 an extension to Midtown was announced, supported with $24 million from DHS. As of 2010, the Midtown Manhattan Security Initiative (MMSI) used 689 surveillance cameras between 30th and 60th Streets. As of 2010, the LMSI and MMSI combined used 1,159 cameras.

The program was further extended in cooperation with Microsoft and is fully active as of 2012. It is known as the Domain Awareness System.

As of August 2014, the LMSCC uses feeds from 6,500 cameras owned by NYPD and private stakeholders, and reads approximately 2 million license plates per day. Whereas most cities' cameras aren't networked and require an individual to retrieve the footage, NYPD's cameras are viewed in real time by officers located at the LMSCC.

== Criticism ==
The plan has been compared to the ring of steel around the City of London, the financial district at the center of Greater London. The City of London had 649 city-government-operated cameras in 2011.

In October 2007, the New York Civil Liberties Union served the NYPD with a FOIA request for all documents related to the planned surveillance system. After multiple requests, the NYPD responded with only 91 pages of documents, prompting the NYCLU to sue the NYPD in State Supreme Court in September 2008.

Gothamist reporter Jake Dobkin expressed concern over the IT security of the LMSI in a critical editorial, noting that the Wi-Fi password for the facility was "P@ssword1".

== See also ==
- Police surveillance in New York City
- New York City Police Department Counterterrorism Bureau
- Domain awareness system
