= New York City Police Department Intelligence Bureau =

Police department division

- Flag of the New York City Police Department
- Motto: Fidelis ad Mortem; Faithful till Death

Agency overview
- Preceding agency: Municipal Police

Jurisdictional structure
- Operations jurisdiction: New York, New York, United States
- Map of New York City Police Department Intelligence Bureau's jurisdiction
- Area: 468.9 square miles (1,214 km^{2})
- Legal jurisdiction: New York City

Operational structure
- Headquarters: One Police Plaza
- Deputy Commissioner responsible: Rebecca Weiner
- Agency executives: Fernando P. Guimaraes, Deputy Chief of Intelligence; Courtney B. Nilan, Deputy Chief of Intelligence
- Parent agency: New York City Police Department
- Boroughs: List: Manhattan North; Manhattan South; Brooklyn North; Brooklyn South; Queens North; Queens South; Bronx East; Bronx West; Staten Island

Website
- www1.nyc.gov/site/nypd/bureaus/investigative/intelligence.page

The New York City Police Department Intelligence Bureau is a division of the New York City Police Department (NYPD) Intelligence and Counterterrorism Bureau (ICB) which claims responsibility for the detection and disruption of criminal and terrorist activity through the use of intelligence-led policing. There is limited oversight over the Intelligence Bureau, and it conducts work in secrecy without the City Council being informed of operations.

The intelligence and counterterrorism divisions fall under the domain of the Intelligence and Counterterrorism Bureau, which is commanded by Deputy Commissioner Rebecca Ulam Weiner.

== History ==
In July 1917, during World War I, the NYPD established a joint-intelligence program with the United States Army and the Military Intelligence Division (MID) at the Brooklyn Army Terminal (BAT). MID, working out of the BAT, co-opted NYPD officers for their intelligence work in the European Theatre. Mostly, the NYPD recruits into the MID's New York field office were from the Neutrality Squad and the Bomb Squad. At the behest of Police Commissioner Arthur H. Woods, this MID unit was placed under the command of Deputy Police Commissioner Nicholas Biddle.

Throughout the Cold War and the Counterculture of the 1960s, the Intelligence Division embedded officers into dozens of groups, including the Black Panther Party.

By 2001, however, its focus had almost entirely shifted to drugs and gangs. The September 11 attacks radically altered the NYPD's approach to the intelligence field.

The Intelligence Division remained headquartered in the BAT until 2002, when it was absorbed into the command structure of the newly created Intelligence and Counterterrorism Bureau (ICB) under David Cohen and moved into its new offices at 1 Police Plaza.

== Current subdivisions ==
=== Intelligence Operations and Analysis Section (IOAS) ===
The IOAS is responsible for both collecting and analyzing data for counter-terrorism purposes.

=== Criminal Intelligence Section (CIS) ===
Similar to the IOAS, the CIS collects and analyzes data for counter-crime purposes. They also conduct the Field Intelligence Officer (FIO) program, where officers conduct intelligence work with narcotics, firearms, and other criminal investigations.

=== International Liaison Program (ILP) ===
The International Liaison Program places NYPD intelligence officers in existing law enforcement agencies around the globe. It was created in 2003 with the intention of counter-terrorism operations and has since found utility in investigating criminal cases that have international elements. The program is externally funded by the New York City Police Foundation. ILP has received criticism for its lack of government oversight, justification, and proper handling of intelligence. Currently, it has officers in 16 cities outside of New York.

== Former subdivisions ==
=== Demographics / Zone Assessment Unit ===
The Demographics Unit (later known as the Zone Assessment Unit) was a secret police intelligence division formed after the September 11 attacks to surveil Muslim-Americans. Police Spokespersons did not publicly acknowledge the unit until after the Associated Press revealed the organization through a Pulitzer Prize award-winning series of articles.

The unit was founded in 2003 through a collaboration with the Central Intelligence Agency, which seconded veteran officer Lawrence Sanchez to the NYPD in 2002 to provide CIA-derived information to the NYPD and to guide the unit's foundation.

The unit's techniques included eavesdropping on conversations held in public locations, gaining access to internet usage by Muslim groups on college campuses by claiming to be investigating narcotics or gang activity, and labeling entire mosques as terror groups in order to record sermons and spy on religious officials without specific evidence of criminal wrongdoing.

Twenty-eight "ancestries of interest were monitored by the unit, ranging from Arab ethnicities like Palestinian and Syrian to heavily Muslim populations from former Soviet states such as Chechnya and Uzbekistan to Black American Muslims". It was noted by the ACLU that the NYPD "expressly excluded from its surveillance and mapping activities non-Muslims such as Coptic Christian Egyptians or Iranian Jews".

In 2013, the Muslim American Civil Liberties Coalition (MACLC), along with Creating Law Enforcement Accountability & Responsibility (CLEAR) and Asian American Legal Defense and Education Fund (AALDEF) published a report critical of NYPD surveillance of their communities, and the Demographics Unit in particular. On April 15, 2014, The New York Times reported that the NYPD officially dismantled the Zone Assessment Unit. However, there is concern that the data gathered through the program is still being used.

in August 2012, the Chief of the NYPD Intelligence Division, Lt. Paul Galati admitted during sworn testimony that in the six years of his tenure, the unit tasked with monitoring Muslim-American life that had not yielded a single criminal lead.

According to the NYPD, there were two specific instances where information from the Zone Assessment Unit was used. In the wake of the 2013 Boston bombing, NYPD deployed to areas inhabited by individuals from the Caucasus region, which includes Chechens, both to ensure people in those neighborhoods were not victimized by retaliation and to ensure that the two perpetrators would not able to blend into the area. In another instance, the NYPD responded in the Hazara community after a Hazara leader was killed by a Pakistan-based organization in Quetta, Pakistan.

In 2018, the NYPD paid out a settlement to groups and persons that were surveilled and agreed to update their training and manuals and that it would not engage in surveillance predicated upon religion.

== See also ==
- New York City Police Department Counterterrorism Bureau
- Police surveillance in New York City
- Organization of the New York City Police Department
