= Domain Awareness System =

Surveillance system by the NYPD and Microsoft

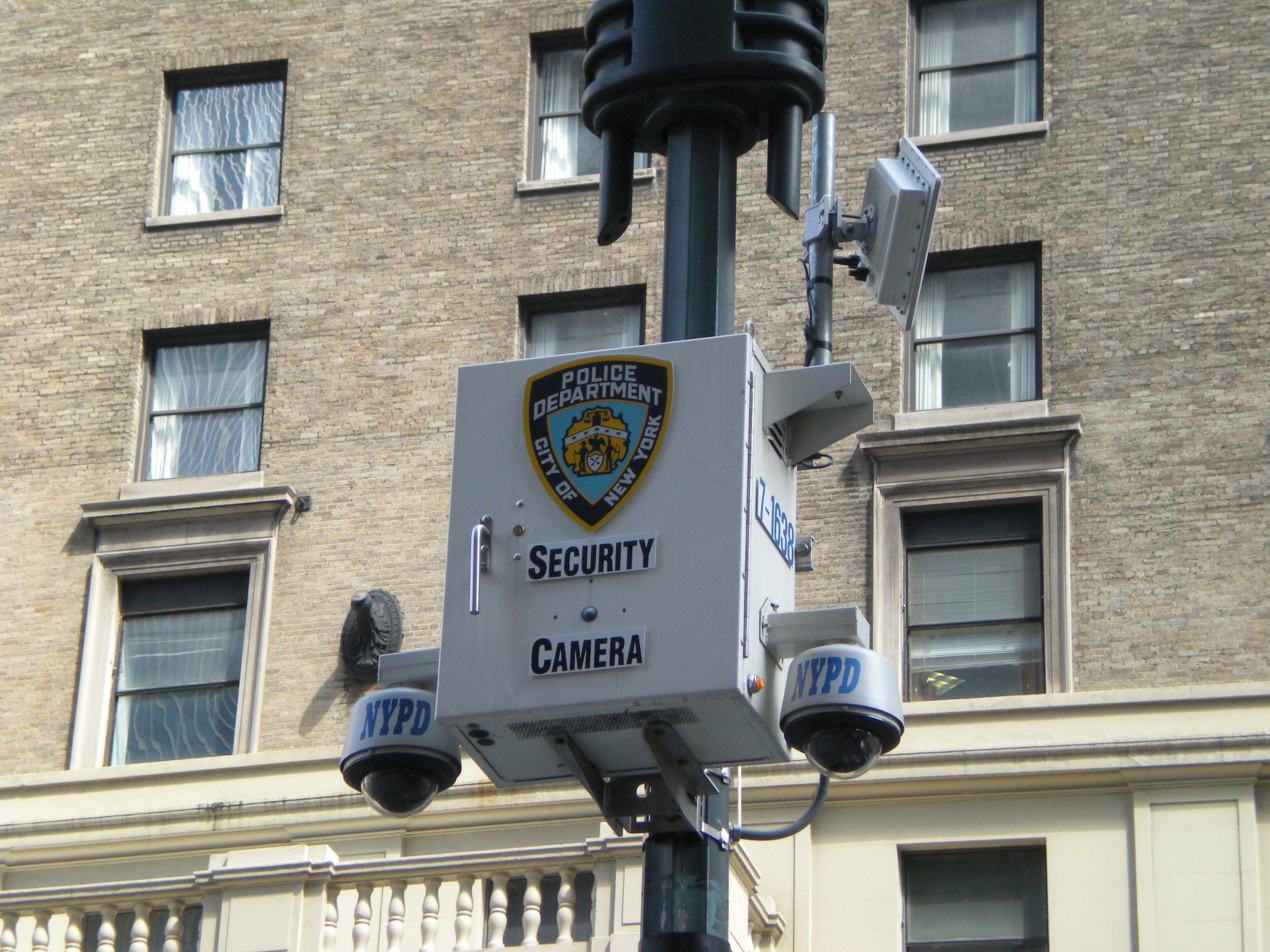
An NYPD-owned CCTV Argus Camera in Madison Square Garden

The Domain Awareness System, the largest digital surveillance system in the world, is part of the Lower Manhattan Security Initiative in partnership between the New York Police Department and Microsoft to monitor New York City. It allows the NYPD to track surveillance targets and gain detailed information about them, and is overseen by the NYPD Counterterrorism Bureau.

The system is connected to 18,000 CCTV video cameras around New York City. It also has access to data from at least two billion license plate readings, 100 million summonses, 54 million 911 calls, 15 million complaints, 12 million detective reports, 11 million arrests, and two million warrants. The data from the CCTV cameras is kept for 30 days, the license plate readings for at least five years. Text records are searchable.

The initial cost of development was funded by $350 million in federal Homeland Security grants. The software component of the system is also licensed out to other cities with New York City getting 30% of the profits.

This system is highlighted in a May 2013 episode of PBS's Nova on tracking the Boston Marathon bombers Tamerlan and Dzhokhar Tsarnaev.

== History ==
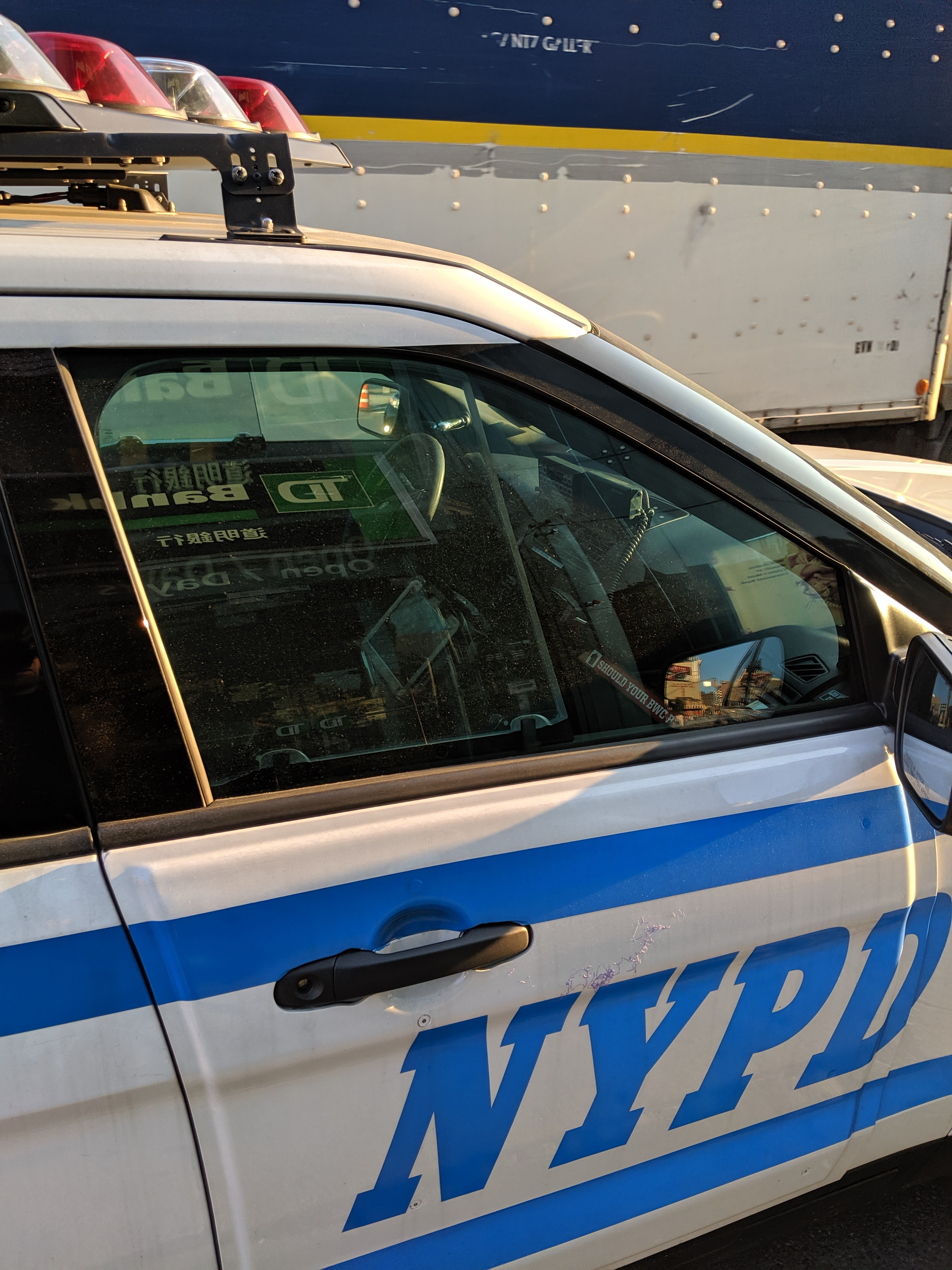
NYPD vehicle with tablet computer installed

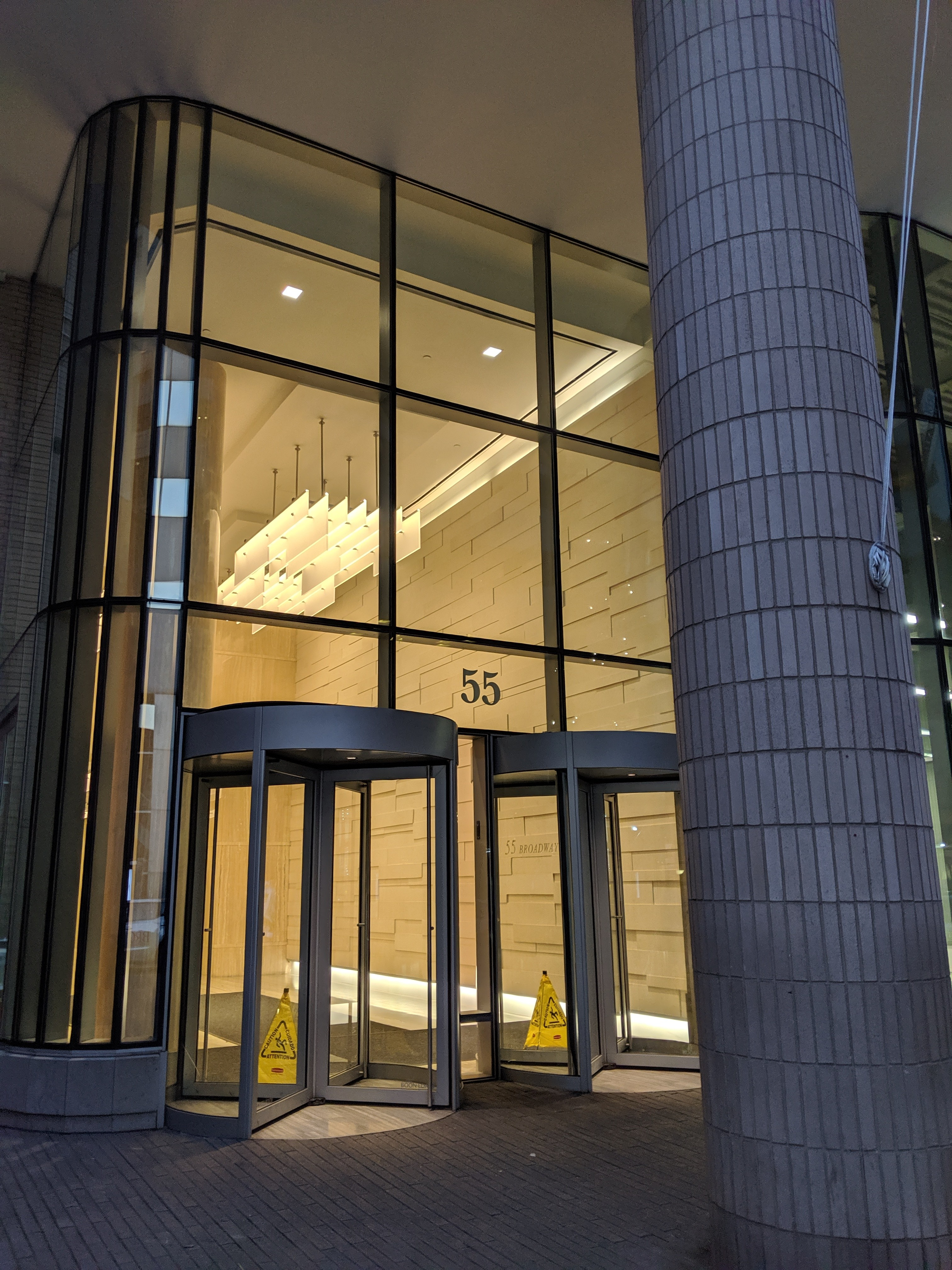
55 Broadway, home of Lower Manhattan Security Coordination Center (LMSCC) which is the hub of the Domain Awareness System

According to internal NYPD documents, prior to 2002 the Department's information technology capabilities were managed by police officers as opposed to IT professionals. After his appointment in 2002, Commissioner Raymond Kelly placed software professional James Onalfo in charge of the NYPD's Office of Information Technology in 2003, beginning a period of widespread modernization.

The NYPD's digital overhaul led to the launch of a data warehouse known as the Real Time Crime Center in 2005, and in 2008 the development of a network of security cameras and automated license plate readers which comprise the Lower Manhattan Security Initiative.

After the 2010 Times Square car bombing attempt, city officials increased efforts to expand the prototype surveillance system from Lower Manhattan into other areas of the city. In August 2012, the NYPD in partnership with Microsoft announced the launch of a Domain Awareness System that would cover all of the five boroughs. Although the system was framed as a counter-terrorism measure, it was acknowledged at the time that any data collected could be used for law enforcement purposes.

In 2014, after the City of New York received $447 million in forfeitures from French bank BNP Paribas, a sum of $160 million was allocated to the NYPD Mobility Initiative in which handheld devices were distributed to officers and ruggedized tablets installed into police vehicles. With these devices, officers were able to access a mobile version of the DAS from anywhere in the city.

== Capabilities ==
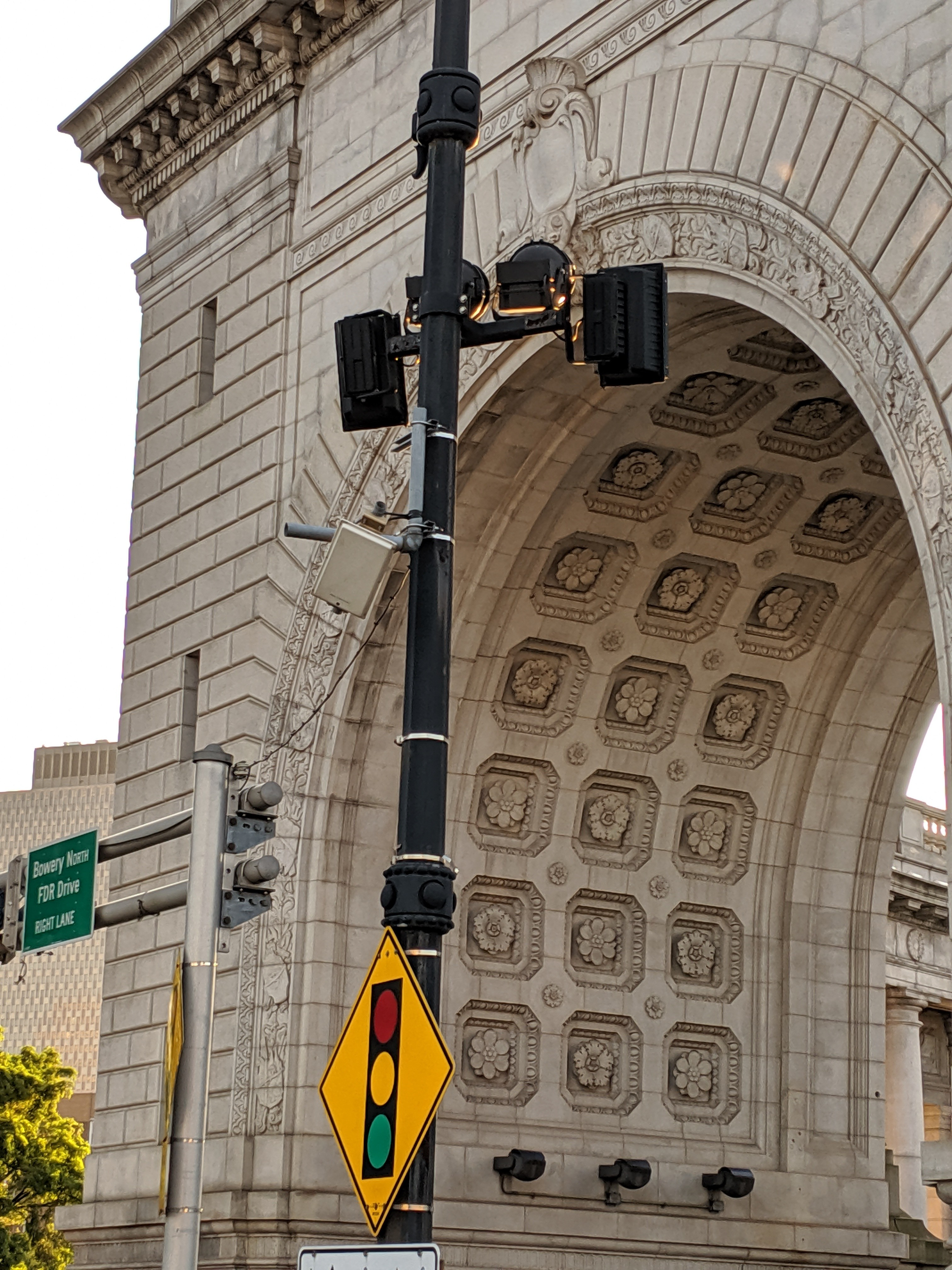
Fixed sensors at the Manhattan end of the Manhattan Bridge

=== Hardware ===
The backbone of DAS is a network of thousands of physical sensors.

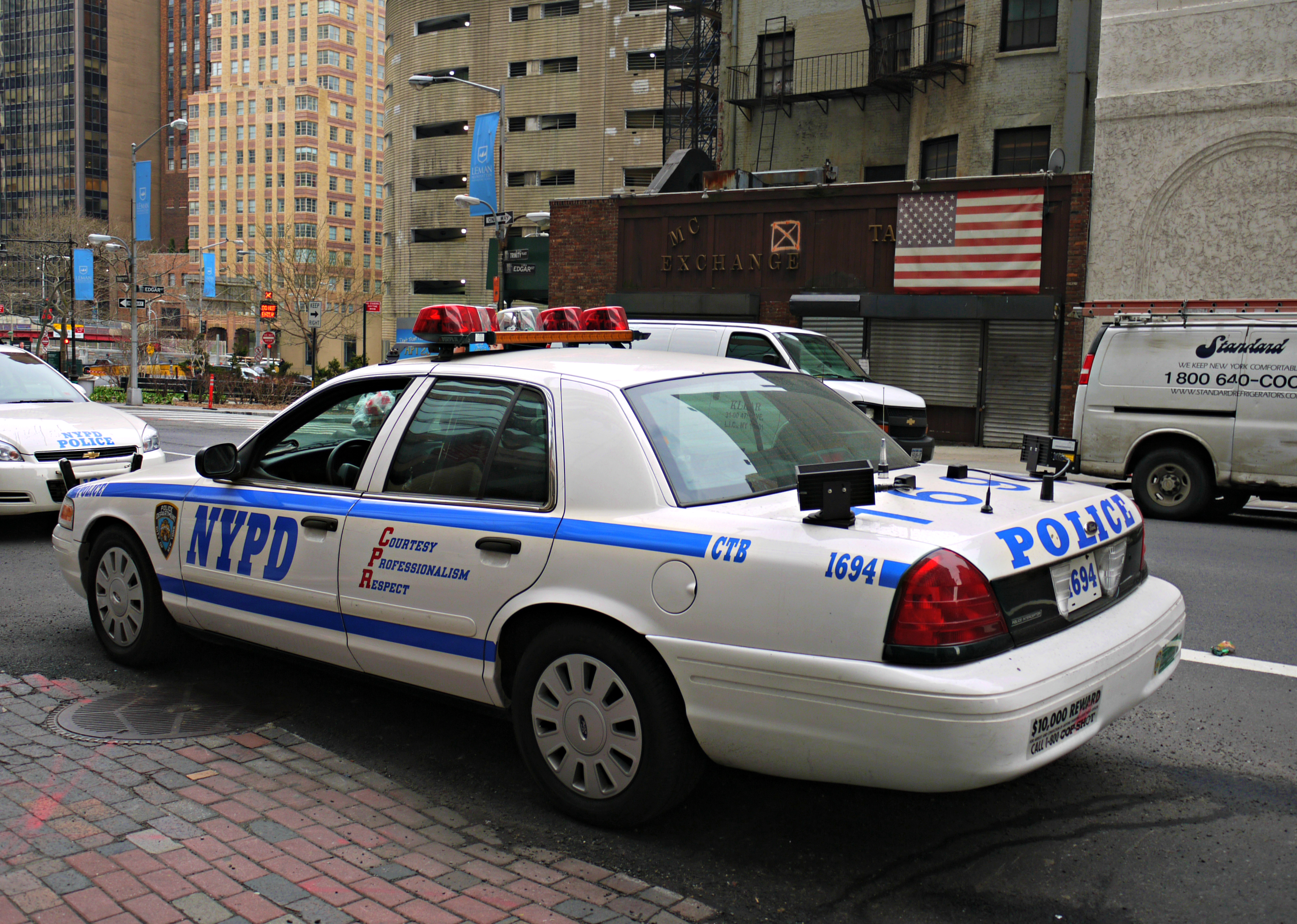
NYPD vehicle with mobile license plate readers

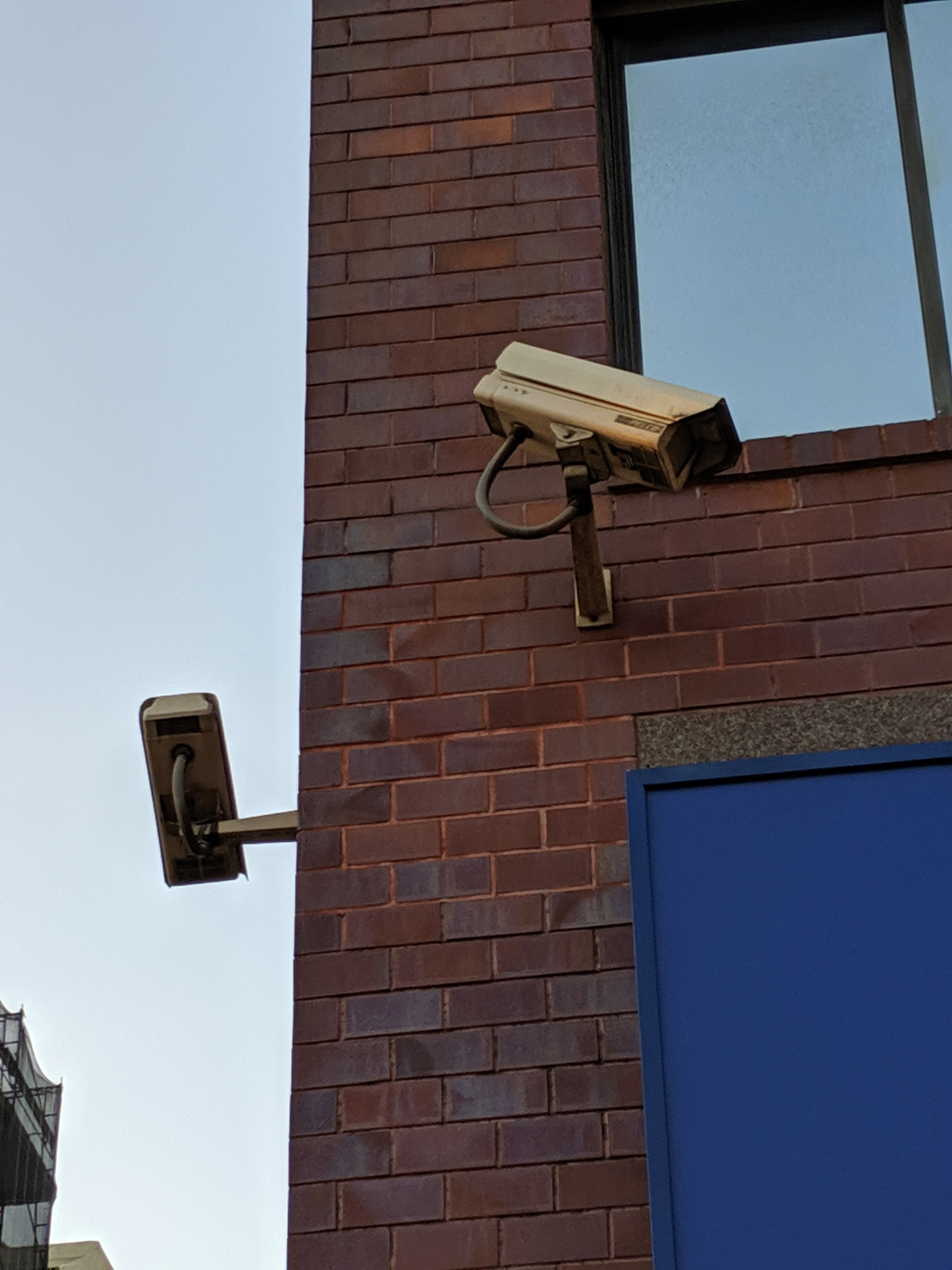
Private CCTV cameras which are part of the DAS

The most widespread are the network of approximately 9,000 CCTV cameras, owned either by the NYPD or private actors, which are used to generate an aggregate citywide video stream, which are maintained for 30 days, and can be searched in realtime by officers. Search queries may include physical characteristics such as shirt color. Search results include live video feeds of all individuals fitting a given query within a given region. The Intercept has claimed that the search functionality extends to racial characteristics such as skin tone. Helinet technologies gave a press release in 2014 stating that they were selected by the NYPD to deploy a custom technology suite to four of the NYPD's Bell 429 GlobalRanger helicopters which "instantl[y] overlays critical information such as addresses, points of interest and other data on top of the live video and then transmit[s] the video and data in real-time via secure microwave downlink" to handheld devices of officers in the field.

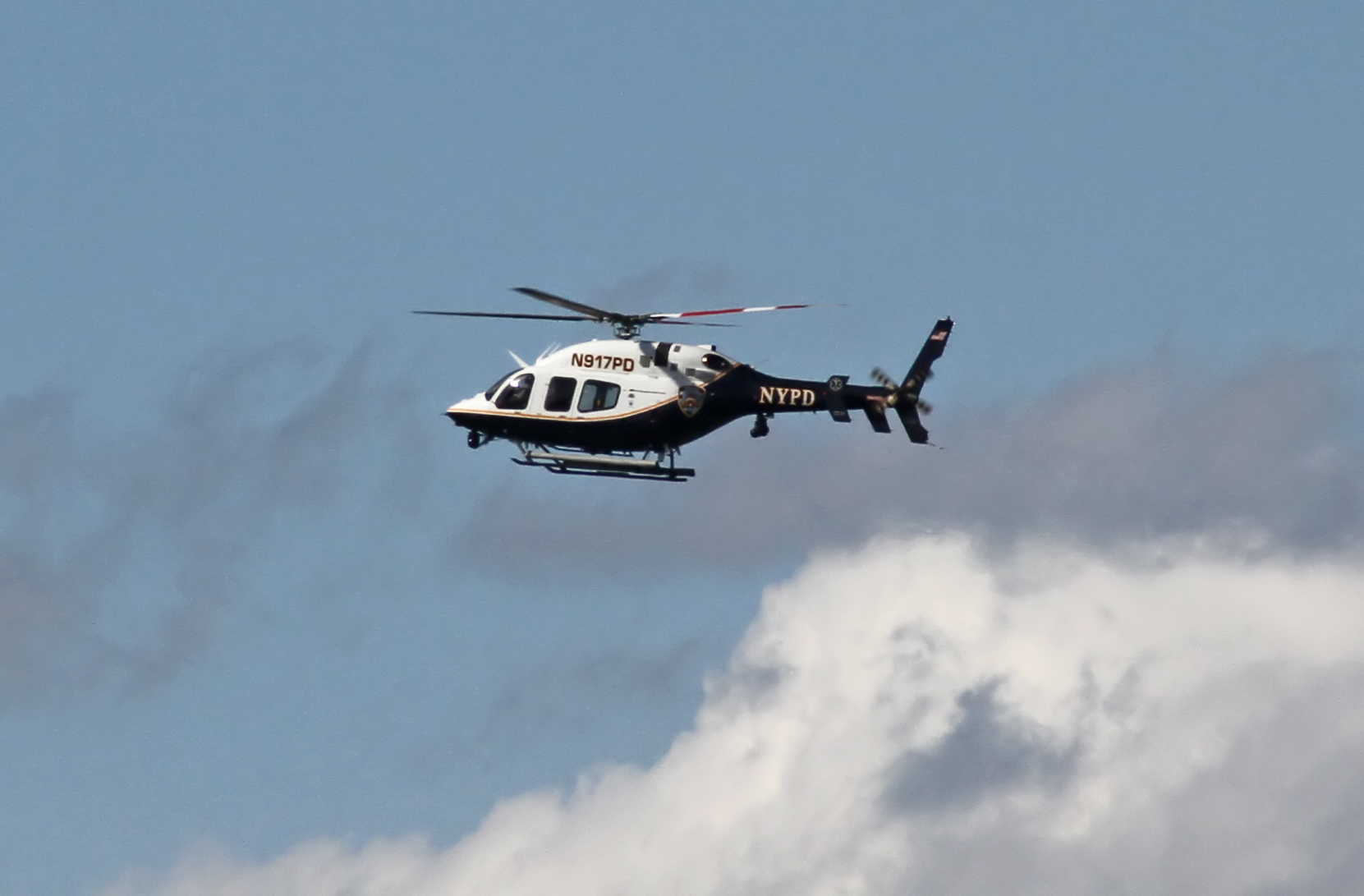
NYPD Bell 429 Helicopter

There are also several hundred automated license plate readers (LPR's) deployed throughout the city, with 50 fixed cameras on bridges and tunnels entering Manhattan and running the full length of Canal Street. These sensors record every spotting of license plates on a NYPD-defined "watch list", generating roughly 3 million records per day. However, all license plate readings are stored for a minimum of five years regardless of whether or not the plate is on any watchlist.

Officers can be alerted whenever a pattern of repeated visits to the same location or route is observed, with the stated goal of making it easier for officers to interdict and apprehend the drivers of monitored vehicles more efficiently than is possible with GPS tracking.

A FOIL request by the NYCLU revealed a $442,500 contract with Vigilance Solutions to provide access to real-time and historical license plate records from around the country.

Additionally, DAS pulls in data from dozens of radiation and chemical sensors located on key infrastructure and precinct roofs, gunshot detectors, and cell tower simulators spread throughout the city.

In 2026, the NYPD announced plans to gain real-time access to cameras managed by New York City Housing Authority developments, by linking the cameras to DAS.

=== Software ===
A machine learning algorithm known as Patternizr is included in the DAS, which connects similar unsolved crimes in order to speed arrests and close old cases. The algorithm is trained on a decade of historic police data of manually identified crime patterns. Patternizr came into use in 2017 when the NYPD hired one hundred civilian analysts to use it. The algorithm now processes over six hundred reports per week. When prompted about the potential for racism embedded into the algorithm, the NYPD responded that the algorithm does not provide different results than a random sampling of police reports. However critics have expressed skepticism, arguing that historical police reports already demonstrate racial bias. Patternizr was released publicly with the intent that it be used and replicated in other police departments.

Live camera feeds are passed through algorithms which detect for suspicious behavior such as unattended bags or entry to restricted areas, and raise these feeds to officer attention via an alert if detected.

Since 2011, the NYPD has also used the DAS to perform facial recognition against both adults and juveniles. The DAS privacy statement specifies it does not use facial recognition.

== Response ==
From the initial announcement of the citywide Domain Awareness System in 2012, critics have suggested that the system represents a possible violation of privacy and should be overseen by a non-police entity.

In 2014, Justice Quarterly published an article stating that there was statistical evidence of the NYPD manipulating CompStat data, which is used by the Domain Awareness System for various purposes including predictive policing. A number of organizations, such as the NAACP, have suggested that predictive policing algorithms that rely on machine-learning and historical police data to make decisions reinforce existing police bias, rather than correct for it.

== See also ==
- Police surveillance in New York City
