= Track and field at the 2011 Military World Games – Men's marathon =

The men's marathon event at the 2011 Military World Games was held on 17 July at the Estádio Olímpico João Havelange.

== Records ==
Prior to this competition, the existing world and CISM record were as follows:

World Record	Haile Gebrselassie (ETH)	2:03:59	Berlin, Germany	28 September 2008
CISM World Record	Mubarak Hassan Shami (QAT)	2:09:22	Venice, Italy	22 October 2005

== Schedule ==
Date	Time	Round
17 July 2011	7:00	Final

== Medalists ==
Gold	Silver	Bronze
Patrick Tambwe Ngoie; France	Rachid Ghanmouni; France	Paul Kosgei; Kenya

== Results ==
=== Final ===
Rank	Name	Nationality	Time	Notes
1st place, gold medalist(s)	Patrick Tambwe Ngoie	France	2:18:17	
2nd place, silver medalist(s)	Rachid Ghanmouni	France	2:18:43	
3rd place, bronze medalist(s)	Paul Kosgei	Kenya	2:20:43	
4	Arkadiusz Gardzielewski	Poland	2:20:52	
5	Pak Song-chol	North Korea	2:21:59	
6	Ramoseka Raobine	Botswana	2:22:18	
7	Kelebonye Simbuwa	Botswana	2:23:38	
8	Deepchand Saharan	India	2:23:50	
9	Lahcen Benlahcen	Morocco	2:24:32	
10	Gino Van Geyte	Belgium	2:24:44	
11	João Sousa	Brazil	2:24:47	
12	Mohamed Ali Gmati	Tunisia	2:28:14	
13	Yang Dinghong	China	2:28:43	
14	Jacob	United States	2:29:41	
15	Samson Nyonyi	Tanzania	2:30:46	
16	Tim Stessens	Belgium	2:31:20	
17	Marco Antonio Erazo Montero	Ecuador	2:32:20	
18	Larry Sanchez	Venezuela	2:33:43	
19	Ajith Bandara	Sri Lanka	2:34:33	
20	Simon Shipingana	Namibia	2:35:56	
21	Ram Singh Yadav	India	2:36:12	
22	Hector Montecinos	Chile	2:38:42	
23	Hussein Awadah	Lebanon	2:39:30	
24	Colin Merritt	Ireland	2:39:34	
25	Francisco Gómez	Chile	2:40:34	
26	Stephen Mckeigue	Ireland	2:41:13	
27	Park Kyung-in	South Korea	2:41:53	
28	Charles Nadeau	Canada	2:44:22	
29	Kingstome Maringe	Zimbabwe	2:45:48	
30	Wilmer Contreras	Venezuela	2:52:23	
31	Ran Zhao	China	2:52:27	
32	Patrick Majerus	Luxembourg	2:53:26	
33	Zvonko Blatnik	Slovenia	2:57:42	
34	Andreas Magnusson	Sweden	2:58:00	
35	Cegar Goran	Serbia	2:58:18	
36	Mattias Bramstang	Sweden	2:59:36	
37	Mario Grech	Malta	3:00:08	
38	Stalin Rafael Barros Reinoso	Ecuador	3:03:40	
39	Dany Papi	Luxembourg	3:05:23	
40	Sergio Pinas	Suriname	3:21:13	
41	Andrew Chimbidlikai	Zimbabwe	3:23:51	
42	Mervin Sibe	Suriname	3:45:00	
43	Igor Jakimovski	Macedonia	4:20:12	
	Abdeslam Siouani	Morocco	DNF	
	Robert Nghipangelwa Kaxuxuena	Namibia	DNF	
	Lee Myung-ki	South Korea	DNF	
	Dragan Todorov	Serbia	DNF	
	Saad Al-Asmari	Saudi Arabia	DNS	
	Damian Paul Chopa	Tanzania	DNS	
	Germano Corcione	Italy	DNS	
	Michael Ott	Switzerland	DNS	
	Seibou Abdourahaman	Togo	DNS	
	Øystein Sylta	Norway	DNS	
	David Valterio	Switzerland	DNS	
	Yaseen Khaled	Bahrain	DNS	
