= Arthur Altschul =

American banking mogul and Goldman Sachs Group partner

- Born: Arthur Goodhart Altschul; April 6, 1920; Manhattan
- Died: March 17, 2002 (aged 81)
- Education: Yale College
- Occupation: Banker
- Spouses: Stephanie Rosemary Wagner (m. 1956; died 1961) Siri von Reis (m. 1963; div. 1972) Diana Landreth Childs (divorced) Patricia Altschul (m. 1996)
- Children: 5, including Stephen and Serena
- Parent(s): Helen Lehman Goodhart; Frank Altschul
- Family: Mayer Lehman (great-grandfather)

Arthur Goodhart Altschul (April 6, 1920 – March 17, 2002) was an American banker and a Goldman Sachs Group partner, and executive at his private family office, Overbrook Management Corporation, founded by his father.

== Early life ==
Altschul was born in 1920 in Manhattan to Helen Lehman Goodhart (maternal granddaughter of Mayer Lehman, one of the three founding brothers of Lehman brothers) and Frank Altschul. He graduated from Deerfield Academy in Massachusetts and in 1943 from Yale College.

== Career ==
He served in the Marines from 1943 through 1945 and was a reporter for The New York Times in the late 1940s.

He worked as an analyst with Lehman Brothers, then joined General American Investors Company and then Goldman Sachs where he served as a general partner from 1959 to 1977 and a limited partner from 1977 to 1999. He was also chairman of General American Investors from 1961 to 1995.

He led the private family office, Overbrook Management Corporation, founded by his father to manage and protect the wealth and financial well-being of the Altschul Family. In 2002, the office opened to provide asset management and related services to institutional investors and high net worth individuals. Over the years, Overbrook's leadership passed to him, and then to the third generation, his son, Arthur Goodhart Altschul, Jr, who currently serves as Overbrook's Chairman.

== Philanthropy ==
Altschul was on the Board of Trustees of many museums and philanthropic organisations, including the Whitney Museum, the United Jewish Appeal, the Overbrook Foundation, the Metropolitan Museum of Art, The American Assembly, and the International Foundation for Art Research.

Barnard College at its 1984 commencement ceremonies awarded Altschul its highest honor, the Barnard Medal of Distinction.

== Personal life ==
Arthur Altschul married four times:

- Stephanie Rosemary Wagner (married 1956), died in a plane crash in 1961; they had two children:
  - Stephen Altschul (born 1957), a mathematician and researcher.
  - Charles Altschul (born 1958).
- Siri von Reis (married 1963; divorced 1972), a botanist. They had three children:
  - Arthur Altschul, Jr. (born 1964), married 2013-2016 to Rula Jebreal.
  - Emily Helen Altschul (born 1966), in November 2002 married John Miller, a journalist and former host of 20/20, a weekly news magazine on ABC.
  - Serena Altschul (born 1970), has worked as a broadcast journalist for the MTV, CNN and CBS networks.
- Diana Landreth Childs (marriage ended by divorce).
- Patricia Dey (married 1996).
