= Serena Altschul =

American broadcast journalist

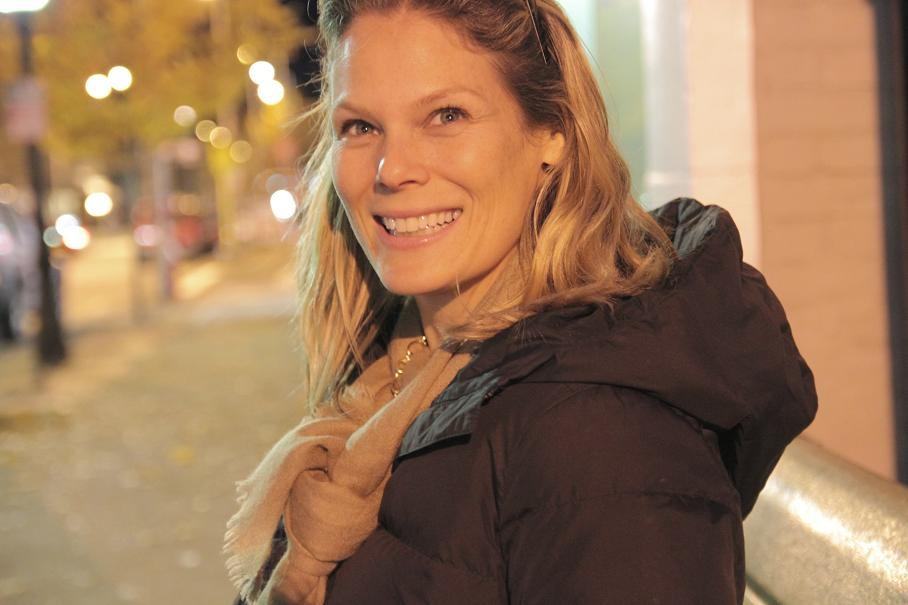
- Altschul in 2011
- Born: October 13, 1970 (age 55); New York City, U.S.
- Education: Scripps College (did not graduate)
- Occupations: News presenter, reporter
- Years active: 1993–present
- Parent(s): Siri von Reis; Arthur Altschul
- Family: Stephen Altschul (brother); Frank Altschul (grandfather); John Miller (brother in law); Whitney Sudler-Smith (step-brother)

Serena Altschul (born October 13, 1970) is an American broadcast journalist, known for her work at MTV News and CBS.

== Early life and education ==
Altschul was born in New York City to Siri von Reis, an author and botanist, and Arthur Altschul, a member of the Lehman banking family. Her mother was of half-Finnish and half-Swedish ancestry and her father was of German Jewish ancestry. After her parents divorced, two-year-old Serena and two of her siblings, Arthur Goodhart Altschul Jr. and Emily Altschul (Miller), grew up living with their mother.

Her half-brothers are Charles Altschul and Stephen Altschul from her father's previous marriage.

Altschul graduated from Millbrook School in New York in 1989, then attended Scripps College for a few years; she studied English literature but did not graduate. In 1993, while still in college, she was the associate producer of The Last Party, a political documentary.

== Career ==
After school, she worked for two years at Channel One News, a channel which was seen nationwide in high schools, as an anchor/reporter. In 1987 she landed a job at MTV and in January 1996 she started working for MTV News.

She also hosted shows such as MTV News: UNfiltered, Breaking it Down and hosted and produced True Life. From 2002 to 2003 Altschul worked at CNN. She was the host and producer of a CNN special about the return of PCP. She continued to work for MTV News while at CNN. On December 23, 2003, she was named a CBS News contributing correspondent. Since 2013 she has appeared on CBS Sunday Morning. She played herself on Jay-Z's 1999 song, "Dope Man". She appeared as herself in the films Light It Up, Queen of the Damned, and Josie and the Pussycats.

== Awards ==
- Edward R. Murrow Award – Sports Reporting 2007
