= John Miller (police official) =

American police official and former journalist (born 1958)

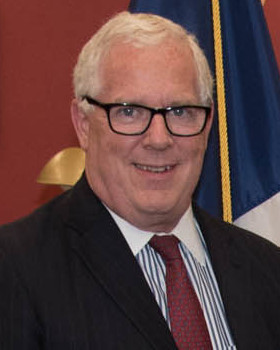
- Miller in 2019
- Born: July 29, 1958 (age 68); New York City, U.S.
- Occupation: Deputy Commissioner New York Police Department
- Years active: 1983–present
- Spouse: Emily Helen Altschul (m. 2002)
- Relatives: Arthur Goodhart Altschul Sr. (father in law); Siri von Reis (mother in law); Serena Altschul (sister in law); Frank Altschul (grandfather in law)

Deputy Commissioner of Intelligence & Counter-terrorism, New York City Police Department
- In office January 1, 2014 – June 28, 2022
- Preceded by: David Cohen
- Succeeded by: Thomas Galati

John Miller (born July 29, 1958) is an American journalist and police official. From 1983 to 1994, he worked as a local journalist in New York City before serving as the NYPD's chief spokesman from 1994 to 1995.

In 1995, Miller joined ABC News and secured an interview with Osama bin Laden in Afghanistan in 1998. In 2003, he returned to law enforcement as a senior official in the LAPD and in 2005 as Assistant Director for Public Affairs at the FBI. Miller was named a senior correspondent for CBS News in 2011.

In 2013, Miller rejoined law enforcement as the NYPD's Deputy Commissioner for Intelligence & Counterterrorism under Commissioner William Bratton. Miller left the NYPD in July 2022 then in September he was hired as CNN's chief law enforcement and intelligence analyst.

== Early life ==
Miller is the son of Lucinda and John J. Miller, a syndicated columnist and freelance writer whose range of roles included Hollywood gossip columnist, foreign correspondent, Broadway critic, crime investigator, and political pundit. "My dad wrote seven columns under six different names... Antonio from Rome. Pierre from Paris. Nigel from London", Miller said. His father was also a close friend of a boss of the Luciano crime family, Frank Costello, whose wife, Lauretta, was Miller's godmother.

Raised in Montclair, New Jersey, Miller attended Montclair High School, where he developed his interest in news and reporting by taking photos for sale to newspapers and skipping school to go to press briefings.

== Career ==
Miller began work as a journalist in 1983 for WNEW, a television station in New York City. From 1985 to 1994, he worked as an investigative journalist for WNBC, another New York television station. Several times during his tenure at the station, he interviewed John Gotti.

From 1994 to 1995, he served as the NYPD's chief spokesman as Deputy Commissioner of Public Information. a move that some of his colleagues considered "going over to the dark side". He was hired at the request of then Commissioner William Bratton.

Miller returned to journalism in 1995 as a ABC News correspondent. Using an al-Qaeda agent in London as an intermediary, Miller asked Mohammed Atef for an interview with Osama bin Laden in May 1998. Miller was told to go to Islamabad, Pakistan, and was escorted over the Afghan–Pakistani border to meet bin Laden in a camp near Kandahar. He asked bin Laden questions that were translated into Arabic by an al-Qaeda translator; bin Laden's answers were not translated, so Miller was not immediately aware of what bin Laden was saying during the interview.

During his tenure at ABC, Miller also covered the September 11, 2001 attacks, where he sat alongside Peter Jennings for the duration of the day listening in to radio conversations from the FBI, the fire department, and the NYPD, informing Jennings and viewers of their content.

In January 2002, Miller took the post of co-anchor with Barbara Walters of the ABC News program 20/20.

In January 2003, he left ABC News to rejoin Bratton, who by then was at the Los Angeles Police Department. Miller served as the police department's Bureau Chief for the Counter-Terrorism and Criminal Intelligence Bureau, which included the Major Crimes Division, and the Emergency Services Division and the Special Investigations Section (SIS). While there, Miller launched Project Archangel which included the Automated Critical Asset Management System (ACAMS), among other platforms, and which has been adopted by other cities and states for ongoing risk-assessment of potential terrorist targets. Miller was also one of the original designers of the Los Angeles Joint Regional Intelligence Center (JRIC), which combines intelligence and analysis for the LAPD, LA sheriff, and the FBI.

In September 2005, Miller became the Assistant Director for Public Affairs at the FBI in Washington, D.C. In this position, he was tasked with overseeing the FBI's internal and external communications, including relations with the news media and handling of fugitive publicity, community relations, and other communications support. Miller also established an Employee Communications Unit to build stronger internal communications to the bureau's 31,000 employees. Among his collateral duties was to serve on the Strategic Execution Team (SET) to establish performance measurement standards for intelligence operations across the FBI's 56 field offices. The system, adapted from the CompStat process used by major police departments, was overseen by then-FBI Director Robert Mueller.

Miller left the FBI when he was named a senior correspondent for CBS News on October 17, 2011. In this capacity, Miller reported for all CBS News platforms and broadcasts, including CBS This Morning and occasionally 60 Minutes. His "Inside the NSA" episode of 60 Minutes in 2013 was criticized for justifying NSA's spying on American citizens.

In December 2013, Miller resigned from CBS in order to become the Deputy Commissioner for Intelligence & Counterterrorism with the NYPD. Miller rejoined William Bratton, who had earlier been announced as the new NYPD Commissioner by Mayor Bill de Blasio. At the end of July 2022, Miller retired from the NYPD.

In September 2022, Miller became the chief law enforcement and intelligence analyst at CNN.

== Personal ==
In 2002, Miller married Emily Altschul, daughter of Arthur Goodhart Altschul Sr.—a banker, a partner at Goldman Sachs Group and a member of the Lehman family— and of Siri von Reis, a botanist. Miller's brother-in-law, Arthur Altschul, Jr., worked for Goldman Sachs and Morgan Stanley before becoming chairman of Medicis Pharmaceuticals Corporation. His sister-in-law is Serena Altschul, a former MTV video-jockey.

=== Awards and honors ===
Miller's journalistic awards include two Peabody Awards, a DuPont-Columbia Award, and nine Emmys.

=== Memberships and affiliations ===
He is a member of the International Association of Bomb Technicians and Investigators and the International Association of Chiefs of Police.

Miller is an instructor at the FBI's National Executive Institute, and the Leadership in Counterterrorism (LinCT) course and has attended training in organizational change at Harvard University's John F. Kennedy School of Government as well as the Kellogg School of Management at Northwestern University.

== See also ==
- List of television reporters
