= Police surveillance in New York City =

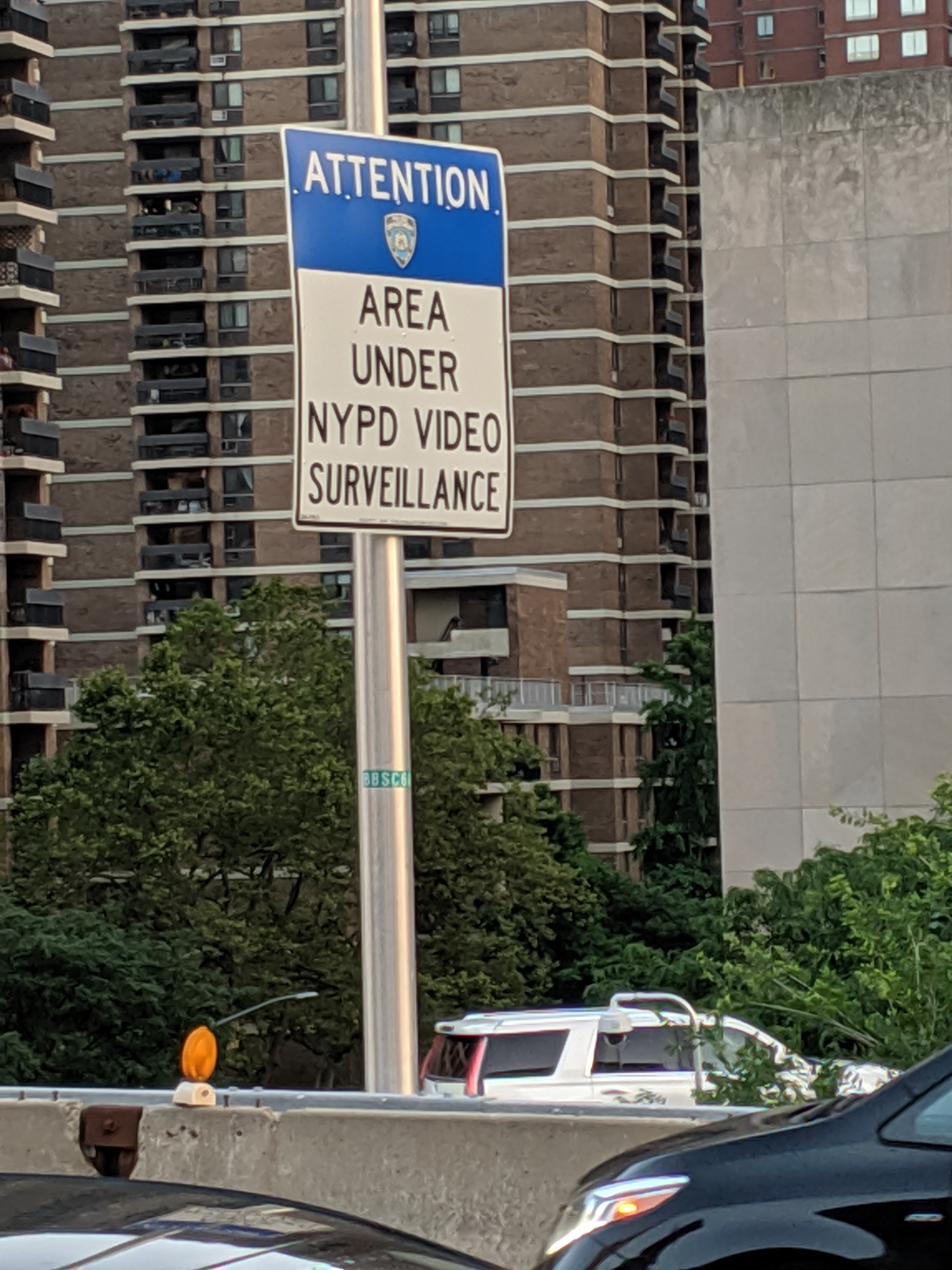
NYPD surveillance disclosure sign on the Brooklyn Bridge, in lower Manhattan

The New York City Police Department (NYPD) actively monitors public activity in New York City, New York, United States. Historically, surveillance has been used by the NYPD for a range of purposes, including against crime, counter-terrorism, and also for nefarious or controversial subjects such as monitoring political demonstrations, activities, and protests, and even entire ethnic and religious groups.

Following the September 11 attacks, the NYPD developed a large and sophisticated array of surveillance technologies, generating large collections of data including billions of license plate readings and weeks of security footage from thousands of cameras. This data is now used in the department's day-to-day operations, from counter-terrorism investigations to resolving domestic violence complaints. The system consists of an interconnected web of CCTV cameras, license plate readers, physical sensors, machine learning software, data analytics dashboards, and mobile apps.

Now centered around the Microsoft-built Domain Awareness System, the NYPD surveillance infrastructure has cost hundreds of millions of US dollars to produce and maintain. Many of its core components are being sold to or emulated by policing departments across the world.

The NYPD has credited surveillance systems as preventing numerous terrorist attacks on the city and helping to provide evidence for hundreds of criminal cases.

Unlike intelligence agencies such as the CIA, the NYPD does not disclose the budget or funding sources for its surveillance system. However, this may change in December 2020 when the POST Act goes into effect.

== History ==
The NYPD has been involved in numerous surveillance activities of NYC throughout its history.

=== Black Panthers and the Handschu Agreement ===
Between the 1950s and 1970s, the NYPD conducted extensive surveillance on the Black Panther Party, Nation of Islam, the Young Lords, suspected communists, and other individuals of interest. The surveillance was conducted by the then anti-communist division known as "The Red Squad", which has since become the more general purpose Intelligence Bureau.

The red squad surveilled and recorded information about targets day to day behaviors on index cards which were then stored at police headquarters. These routine behaviors included granular detail such as which table individuals were seated at during a fundraiser dinner, and how much they paid for the meal. In 2016, 520 boxes of notecards were discovered in a Queens warehouse. The city records department has yet to release these boxes to the public but has stated it is working on rules to allow access.

Since the 1980s the surveillance records from the red squad were required to be open to the public, allowing individuals to request copies of files written on them. However many requests for such files have been rejected, and the files themselves shuffled such that indexing of the documents is not possible. Civil rights attorneys and critics of the NYPD such as Jethro Eisenstein have argued that this difficulty in obtaining documents is the result of a concerted effort by the department to restrict public access to policing data. Prior to the discovery of the notecards, historian Johanna Fernández sued to have surveillance information on the Young Lords released and was told by the NYPD that no such documents existed, and that officials searched for over 100 hours for any pertinent files without success.

In 1969, twenty-one members of the Black Panthers were indicted on charges of planning bombings on police and civilian targets. The police were found to have been conducting comprehensive surveillance of the group, and after only ninety minutes all defendants were acquitted. The Handschu agreement was made following a class action lawsuit on the behalf of the defendants, which regulates the capacity for police surveillance.

in 1971 a lawsuit was opened against the NYPD arguing that the surveillance data such as those collected by the red squad violated the Handschu agreements and the constitution, the lawsuit remains open to this day and police officials claim it will last forever.

=== CompStat and the Dropping Crime Rate ===
In the early 1990s, then-deputy police commissioner Jack Maple designed and implemented the CompStat crime statistics system. According to an interview Jack Maple gave to Chris Mitchell, the system was designed to bring greater equity to policing in the city by attending to crimes which affected people of all socioeconomic backgrounds including previously ignored poor New Yorkers.

Also at this time, the Dirty thirty (NYPD) police scandal was unfolding in Harlem, which involved illegal search and seizures of suspected and known drug dealers and their homes.

== Methods ==
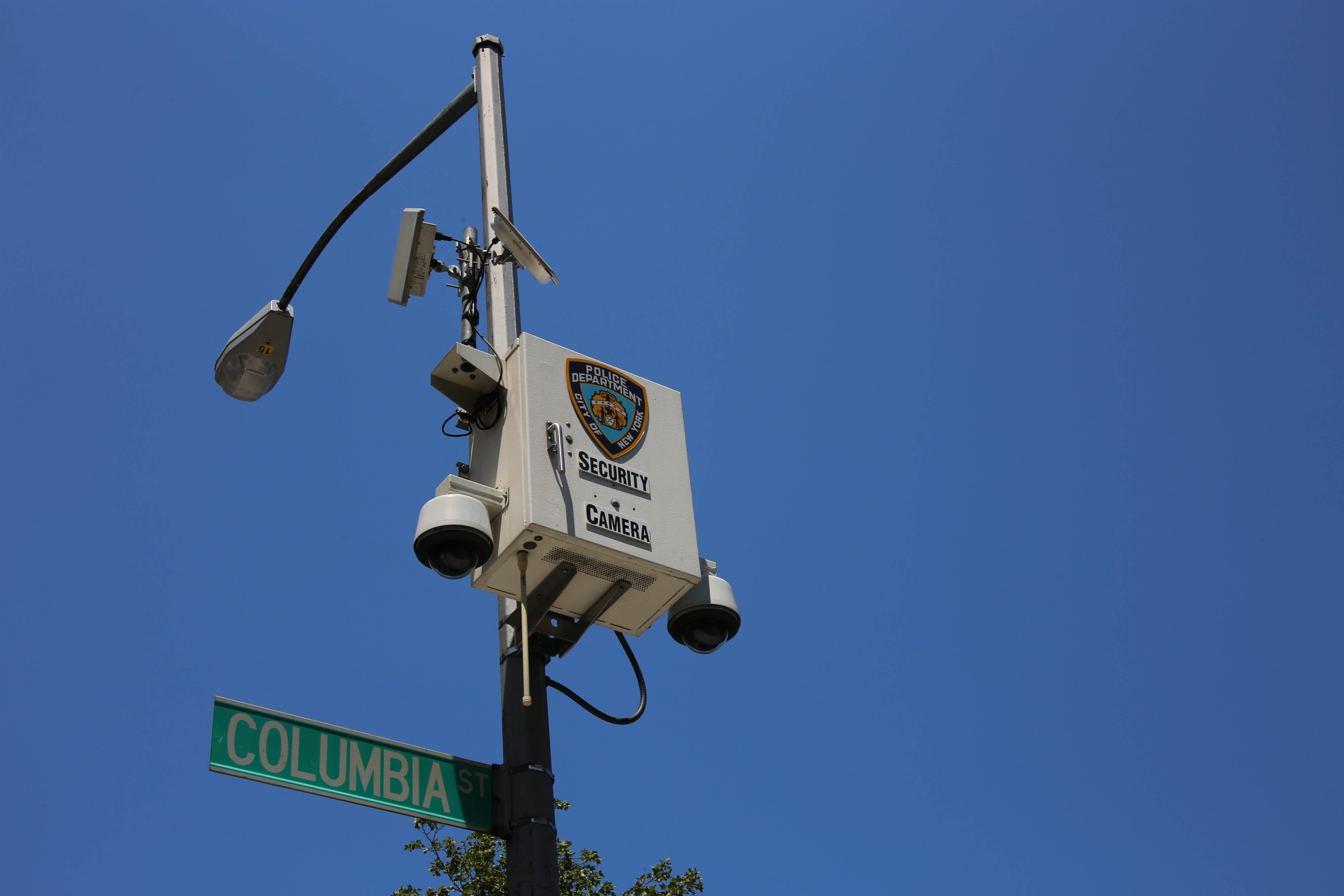
NYPD CCTV Argus surveillance cameras used by the Domain Awareness System.

=== Domain awareness system and cameras ===
The NYPD uses the Domain Awareness System (DAS) to perform surveillance across New York City - the system being composed of numerous physical and software components, including over 18,000 CCTV cameras around New York City. This surveillance is conducted on all people within range of sensors including people walking past security cameras or driving past license plate readers, it is not restricted to suspected criminals or terrorists. Additionally, individuals may be tracked across the country through nationwide sensor systems. Data collected from the DAS is retained for varying amounts of time depending on the type of data, some records being retained for a minimum of five years.

In 2014, speed cameras were introduced into 20 school zones within the five boroughs. Since July 2019, 750 school zones have speed cameras operating between 6 A.M. and 10 P.M.

The images in the DAS are used for facial recognition. The NYPD's privacy statement for the Domain Awareness System specifies that it does not use facial recognition.

=== Surveillance of ethnic and religious groups ===
In 2001, the NYPD established a secret program (known as the Demographics Unit, and later the Zone Assessment Unit) to surveil American Muslim daily life throughout New York City and the nation. The Demographics Unit was tasked with monitoring 28 "ancestries of interest, ranging from Arab ethnicities like Palestinian and Syrian to heavily Muslim populations from former Soviet states such as Chechnya and Uzbekistan to Black American Muslims".

In June 2012, NYPD Assistant Police Chief Thomas Galati, the commanding officer of the Intelligence Division, admitted during sworn testimony that in the six years of his tenure, the unit tasked with monitoring American Muslim life had not yielded a single lead.

The Moroccan Initiative was a similar ethnicity-based surveillance program of Moroccan Americans following the 2004 Madrid train bombings.

The Intelligence Division units that were engaged in the NYPD’s Muslim surveillance program include its Demographics Unit, renamed the Zone Assessment Unit (now disbanded); the Intelligence Analysis Unit; the Cyber Intelligence Unit; and the Terrorist Interdiction Unit. In 2017, The Daily Beast reported that the NYPD continues to perform surveillance on the Muslim community in NYC.

The New York Times reported in 2013 that four CIA officers were embedded in the NYPD in the decade after September 11 attacks, and those officers were involved in nationwide surveillance operations. One of these officers, Lawrence Sanchez, was significantly involved with the founding of the Demographics Unit.

=== Undercover investigations of activists and protestors ===
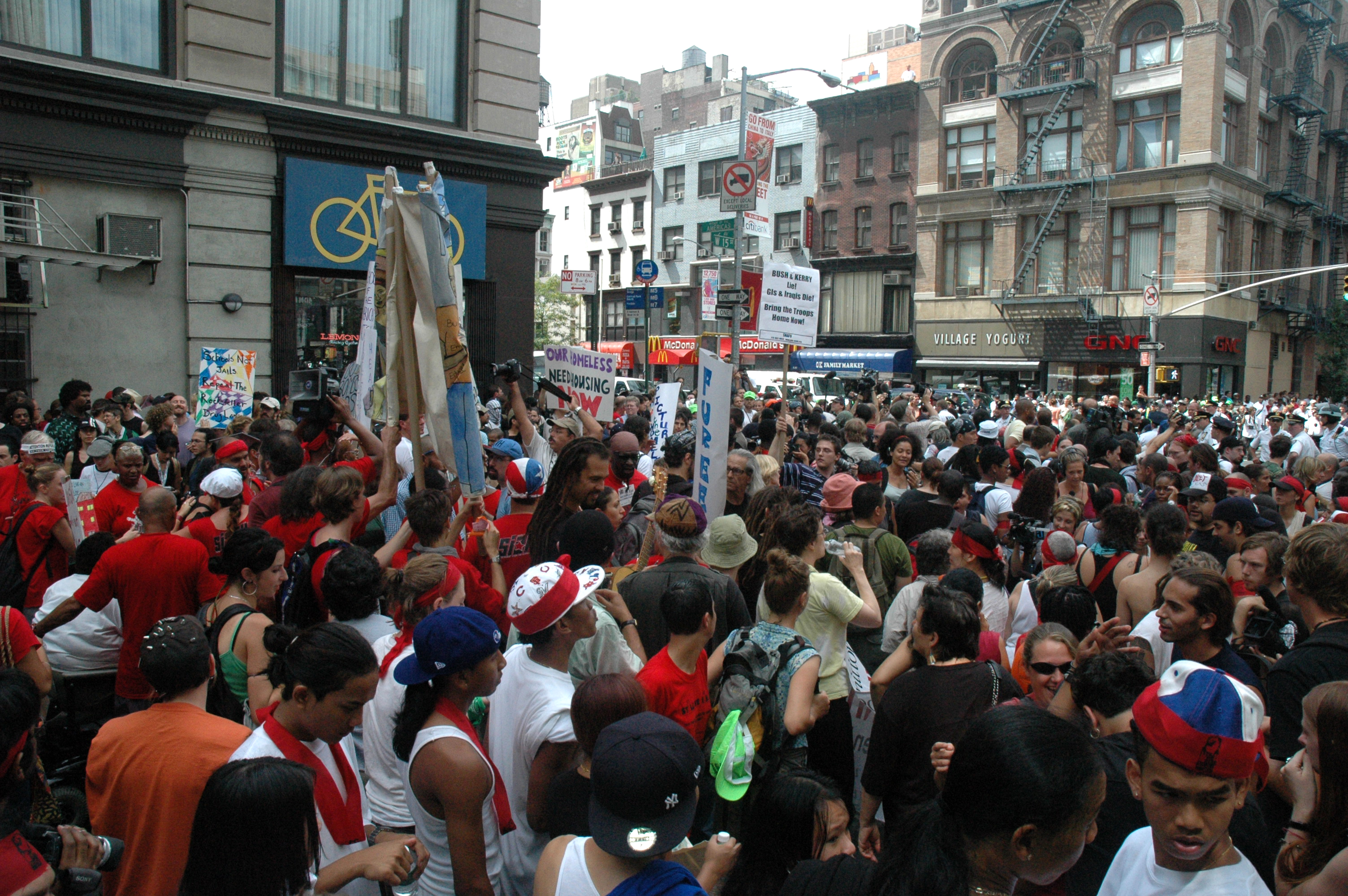
Protest of the 2004 Republican National Convention in New York City

Judge Charles S. Haight ruled in 2003 that the NYPD issued a request to eliminate all rules related to the Handshu agreement, but that relaxed rules would be reasonable and comparable to similarly relaxed regulations adopted by the FBI in 2002. He amended his ruling to add these relaxed rules into a court order stating that the "NYPD is in need of discipline, following interrogation of anti-war demonstrators by the NYPD where the activists were required to fill out a "Demonstration Debriefing Form" which asked about individual ideologies such as their opinions on Israel and their political affiliation which was then entered into a database. Following this judgement, police no longer required "specific information about criminal activity" to surveil a political or religious gathering, and instead only needed to show "a law enforcement purpose".

Videotapes recorded between 2004 and 2005 revealed NYPD officers posing as activists to surveil at least seven Iraq War protest events, including wearing of political pins and participating in mock arrests by riot police. Prior to the 2004 Republican National Convention New York police broadly spied on people planning protests during the convention, and sent undercover officers nationwide to infiltrate various grass-roots political groups. Officials with the city and the Police Department defended their tactics, saying they needed to ferret out potential terrorists and protesters who intended to act violently or to commit vandalism.

In January 2019, NYPD e-mail messages were released which indicated surveillance of activists within the Black Lives Matter protests. These e-mails included references to the activists being "idiots" and "ninjas".

Following an internal investigation on compliance to the Handschu agreement in 2016, the NYPD inspector general found that in the cases reviewed both NYPD investigations and their use of informants and undercover officers continued after approval expired.

=== Stop and Frisk ===
The tactic of "Stop and Frisk" increased dramatically in 2008 to over half a million stops, 88% of which did not result in any fine or conviction, peaking in 2011 to 685,724 stops, again with 88% resulting in no conviction. On average, from 2002 to 2013, the number of individuals stopped without any convictions was 87.6%.

Stop and frisk became the subject of a racial profiling controversy, in part because of the large majority of people of color who were stopped - in 2011, 91% of stops were performed on Black and Latino New Yorkers.

Mugshots from stop and frisk arrests are used by the facial recognition system used by the NYPD and personal data of those arrestees used to increase charges if arrested again, even when no charges were filed based on the initial stop.

=== Cellphone tracking ===
The NYPD has employed a number of cellphone surveillance strategies including Stingray phone trackers and cell tower dumps.

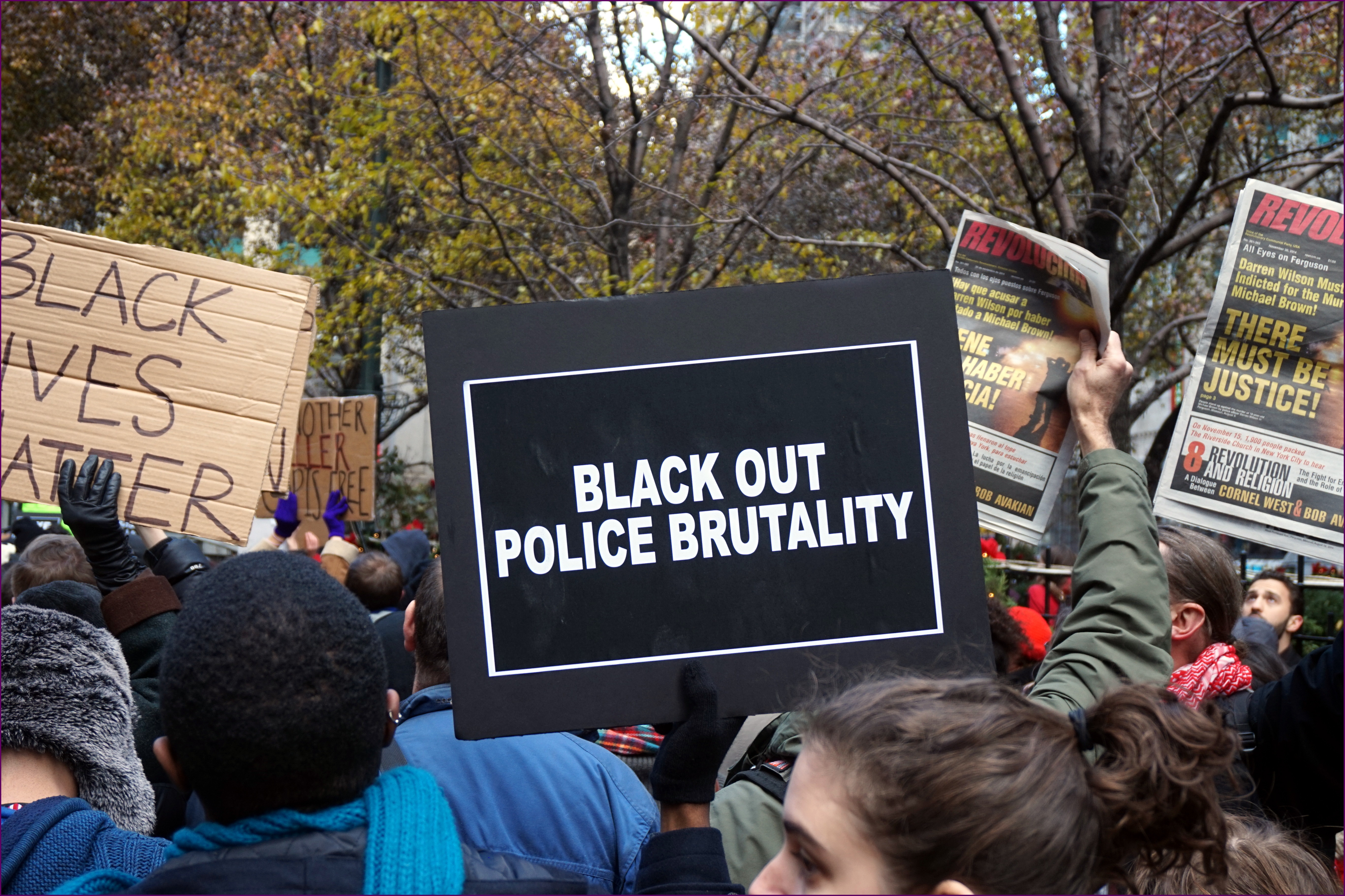
The NYPD surveilled activists in the Black Lives Matter movement.

In 2014 the International Business Times reported that the NYPD conducted cellphone tower dumps in response to unknown individuals raising a white flag on top of the Brooklyn Bridge. Tower dumps give lists of all phone numbers which were near a cell tower at a given time.

According to the NYCLU, the NYPD "disclosed the use of Stingrays more than 1,000 times between 2008 and May of 2015 without a written policy and following a practice of obtaining only lower-level court orders rather than warrants" without revealing "what models of Stingrays [are used] or how much taxpayer money is used to purchase and maintain them." In January 2019, a judge ordered that the NYPD must officially disclose if a Stingray phone tracker was used by the NYPD to monitor activists cellphone communications.

=== Gang databases ===
The NYPD operates a computer database of suspected gang members called the "criminal group database”, which in February 2019 contained over 42,000 individuals before shrinking to 18,000 in June 2019 where it now fluctuates due to thousands of names being added and removed. 1.1% of the individuals in the database are white, 66% are Black, and 31.7% are Latino. The Legal Aid Society created a website for individuals to conduct a FOIL request to see if they are in the database, the NYPD has rejected all FOIL requests on this subject. Being in this database affects treatment within the court system including the severity of charges leveled against a defendant.

Many criteria can lead to an individual being identified as a gang member, including admitting to being in a gang; being identified by two reliable sources within a gang; being seen in a "known gang location" wearing either black, gold, yellow, red, purple, green, blue, white, brown, khaki, gray, orange, or lime green; or doing other unspecified activities identified by the NYPD as being gang-affiliated. The NYPD also monitors social media activity, and may add individuals to the database if they engage with social media posts connected to people who are already in the gang database.

=== Facial recognition ===
In 2012, then Mayor-Michael Bloomberg claimed facial recognition "is something that's very close to being developed".

Since 2011, the NYPD has a dedicated unit of officers known as the facial identification section (or FIS) using facial recognition technology to compare images taken from DAS with photos like mug shots, juvenile arrest photos, and pistol permits. In the first five and half years of using the software, the NYPD arrested 2,878 individuals based on facial recognition matches.

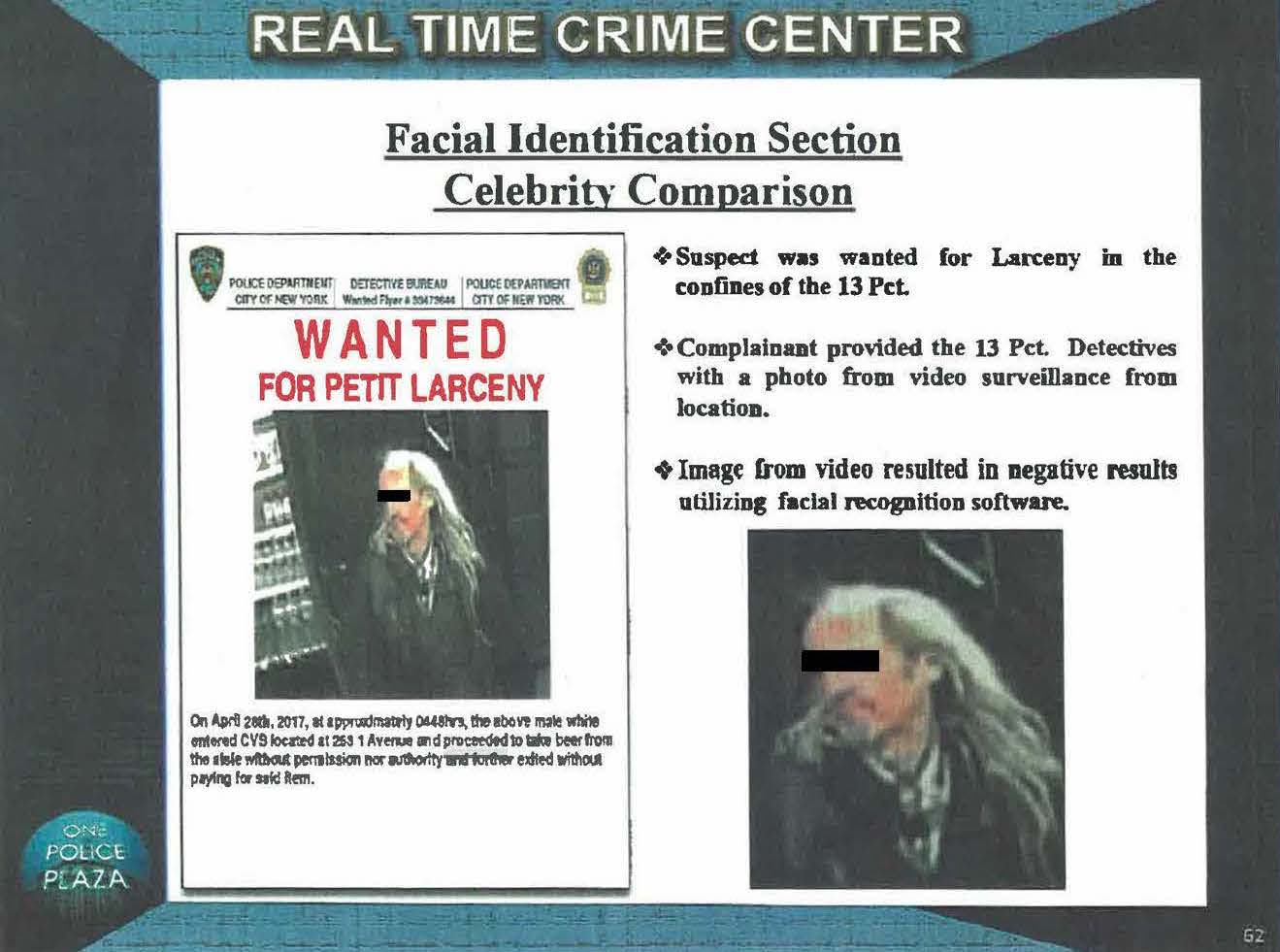
Wanted poster for a beer thief, who the NYPD used facial recognition against an image of Woody Harrelson to arrest.

Police officials use photoshop tools such as blur and clone stamp, copy and paste different individuals lips and eyes onto photographs, merge multiple faces together, and use 3-D modeling software to generate images of faces partially covered or turned away from the camera in order to generate find potentially matching images. When the system fails to generate a response, officials have been recorded passing celebrity look-a-likes through the database, such as in 2017 when a photograph of Woody Harrelson was used to generate image matches for a person stealing beer, or an unknown New York Knicks player (name redacted by the NYPD) used in pursuit of a man wanted for assault, which were both revealed after a two year court case between the NYPD and Georgetown University Law Center. Edited images cannot be processed accurately by facial recognition software as the software cannot distinguish between original and modified features, which could lead a detective to falsely assess a match as likely when the system incorrectly returns a high confidence score.

The NYPD has attempted to use police sketches in facial recognition software in the past but concluded they did not work.

In 2015, the juvenile database was integrated into the same system, and facial recognition has been used to compare images from crime scenes with its collection of juvenile mug shots. The NYPD has been documented keeping photos in the juvenile database for several years, which leads to security footage comparison against potentially outdated images. As of August 2019, photos of 5,500 individuals used for comparison by the system were retained despite 4,100 of them no longer being considered a juvenile. Depending on the severity of a felony charge, the NYPD is allowed to take arrest photos of minors as young as 11.

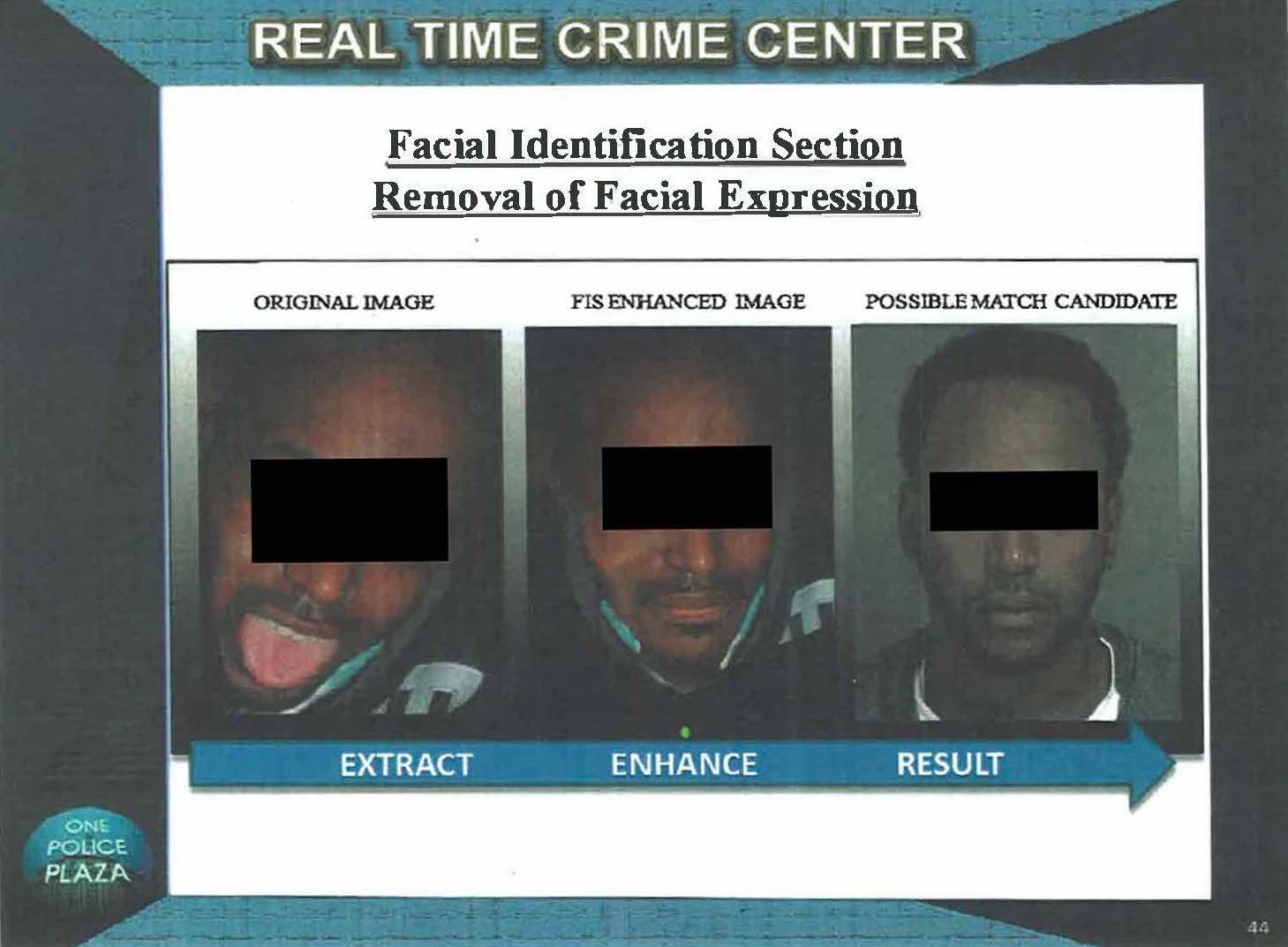
NYPD image depicting image modification to change an individual's facial expression from open-mouthed to closed-mouthed, and the subsequent suspect generated by the facial recognition system.

The NAACP Legal Defense and Educational Fund released a statement in August 2019 stating that the "It is well-documented that facial recognition technology routinely misidentifies darker skin, women, and young children. [...] This flawed technology puts the children of [Black, Latinx and Muslim people] and other targeted communities at grave risk. Deploying these experimental and biased practices to target children, especially without public or parental knowledge is wholly unacceptable."

NYPD officials report that they "compare images from crime scenes to arrest photos in law enforcement records" and that they "do not engage in mass or random collection of facial records from NYPD camera systems, the internet, or social media.” In an interview with the verge, one NYPD detective states “No one has ever been arrested on the basis of a facial recognition match alone. As with any lead, further investigation is always needed to develop probable cause to arrest. The NYPD has been deliberate and responsible in its use of facial recognition technology."

A Georgetown law report disagrees with this NYPD assessment, citing specific instances such as a case where an officer arrested a suspect after text messaging a witness “Is this the guy…?" with an attached algorithmically matched photograph. Another arrest was made after a lineup, where the arrested individual was placed into the lineup purely due to being selected by a facial recognition algorithm.

In 2019 the MTA began testing the use of facial recognition.

=== X-ray surveillance ===
The NYPD has declined to describe how they employ their X-ray vans, stating that any information about past uses could give terrorists adequate knowledge to foil future missions. However, probing done by an investigative journalist from ProPublica has revealed potential public health concerns relating the backscatter X-ray technology. After a 3-year legal battle with ProPublica and a brief from the NYCLU, the NYPD is now required to share any documents detailing the health and safety risks associated with deploying the vans around the city. The NYCLU speculates that the vans cost between $729,000 to $825,000 each.

=== Genetic sampling ===
The NYPD maintains a database of genetic information, collected from individuals who have been convicted of a crime, arrested, or questioned by police. Genetic material from the database can be collected from objects touched by individuals being questioned such as cigarettes and cups. The database has 82,473 genetic profiles, growing 29% between 2017 and 2019. The legal aid society claims that 31,400 of those profiles came from individuals not convicted of a crime.

In 2016, the NYPD collected hundreds of genetic samples from individuals in the region around Howard Beach, Queens in an attempt to solve the murder of Karina Vetrano.

=== Social media monitoring ===
The NYPD follows social media accounts and stores posts of interest offline, retaining them for years after the initial collection. In one case the department collected suspected gang members' Facebook posts for four years before making an arrest.

=== Drones ===
Anti-ICE protest in Manhattan with a police surveillance drone overhead, 2026 See also: ICE and New York City during the second Trump presidency

Between April and June 2014, the NYPD purchased 14 drones at a cost of $480,000 from Chinese-based company DJI technology equipped with 4K resolution cameras. Of these drones, two were large ruggedized 'M210 RTK' quadcopters with thermal and 3d imaging technology, eleven were smaller 'Mavic Pro' quadcopters measuring less than two feet in diameter, and one was a 'DJI Inspire' quadcopter intended for training purposes. The drones are operated by two officers from the NYPD's Technical Assistance Response Unit, one who monitors the drone and the other who controls it.

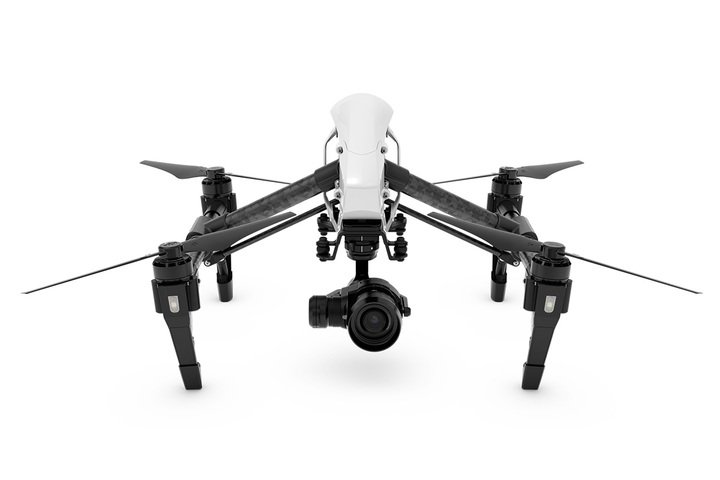
DJI inspire

Policies on the use of drone technology include that it will not use facial recognition and will only be deployed to monitor pedestrian and vehicle congestion and for security observation at shootings and large scale events. Additionally, the chief of police can approve drone use for public safety or emergency situations.

Critics such as the NYCLU argue that the generality of the term 'large scale events' allows for drones to be used in a broad range of applications, including the monitoring of protestors and activists. They also argue that although the drones themselves cannot perform facial recognition as per the policy, the footage collected from drones can still be used for such purposes. As with other video collected by the NYPD, drone footage is retained for a minimum of 30 days upwards to an indefinite period if needed for unspecified legal purposes.

Police officials state that the drones will not be used for unlawful surveillance, and will not be equipped with weapons. Further they state that it is negligent to not use drone technology.

== Governance and policy ==
=== NYPD self-governance ===
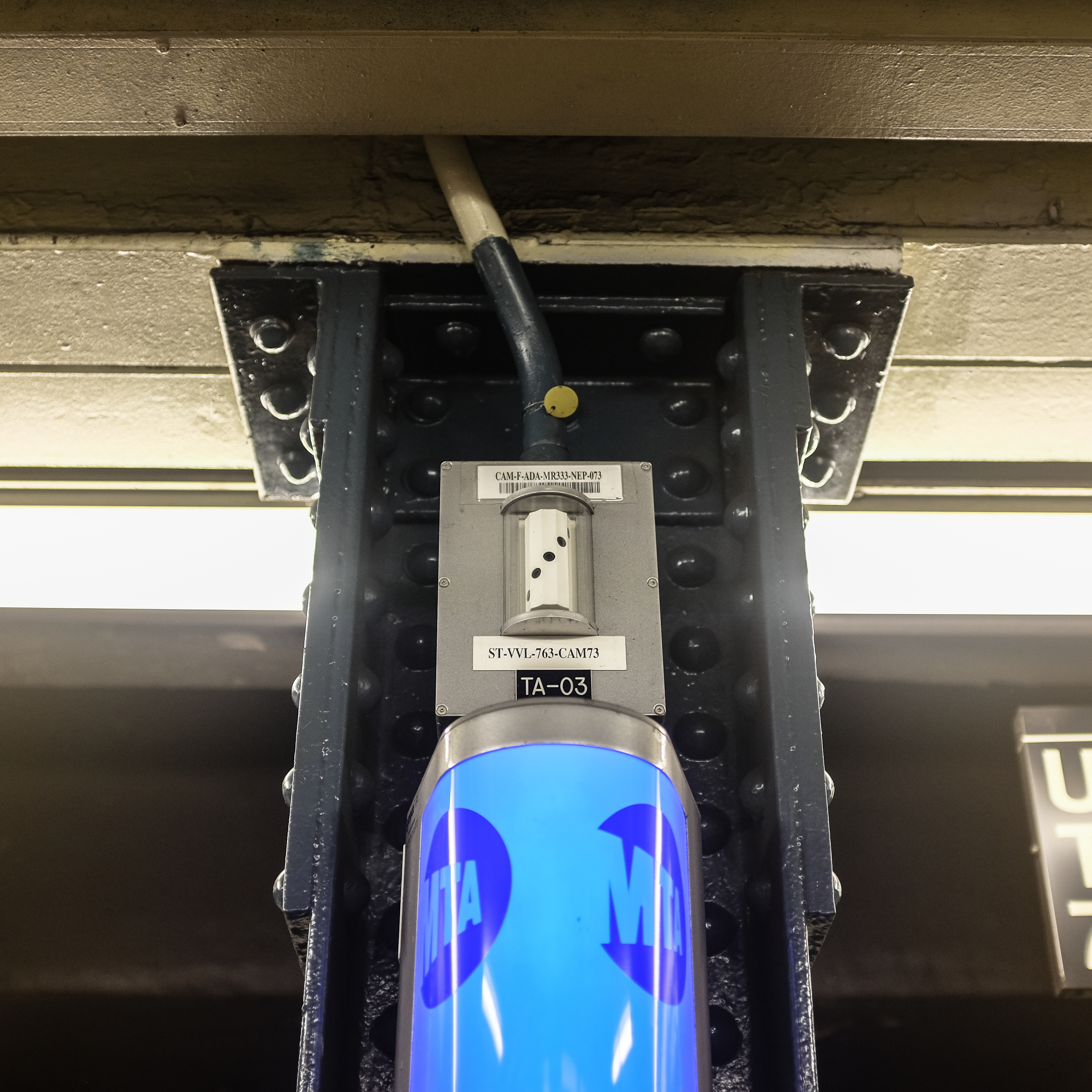
180 degree security camera on a New York City Subway platform

In April 2009, the NYPD released privacy guidelines for the domain awareness system's usage of data, specifying regulations such as data collection being utilized only in public areas and the DAS not using facial recognition.

In 2012 Olivia J. Greer provided criticism of the NYPD privacy guidelines in the Michigan Telecommunications and Technology Law Review, stating that "the NYPD and the Guidelines make it clear that “flexibility” is required to protect the public, and are very unclear with regard to how much and what type of flexibility is required. [...] Of overarching concern is the fact that the Guidelines allow data to be used for indeterminate “legitimate law enforcement and public safety purposes” beyond the scope of the Statement of Purpose. This effectively means that data may be used for any purpose identified by the NYPD to relate to law enforcement, but not encompassed in the Guidelines. Perhaps the most troubling aspect of the Guidelines appears in the final paragraph: a disclaimer that states “[n]othing in these Guidelines is intended to create any private rights, privileges, benefits or causes of action in law or equity.” Thus, the Guidelines are not legally enforceable."

=== City governance ===
==== Local Law 49 ====
In 2017 local law 49 was introduced to the New York City Council, which prompted the "creation of a task force that provides recommendations on how information on agency automated decision systems may be shared with the public and how agencies may address instances where people are harmed by agency automated decision systems". Due to the broadness of this bill, it would include NYPD surveillance algorithms within its scope. However, as of June 2019, it has been reported that the taskforce struggled to gain the necessary information from government agencies in order to generate their recommendations.

==== POST Act ====
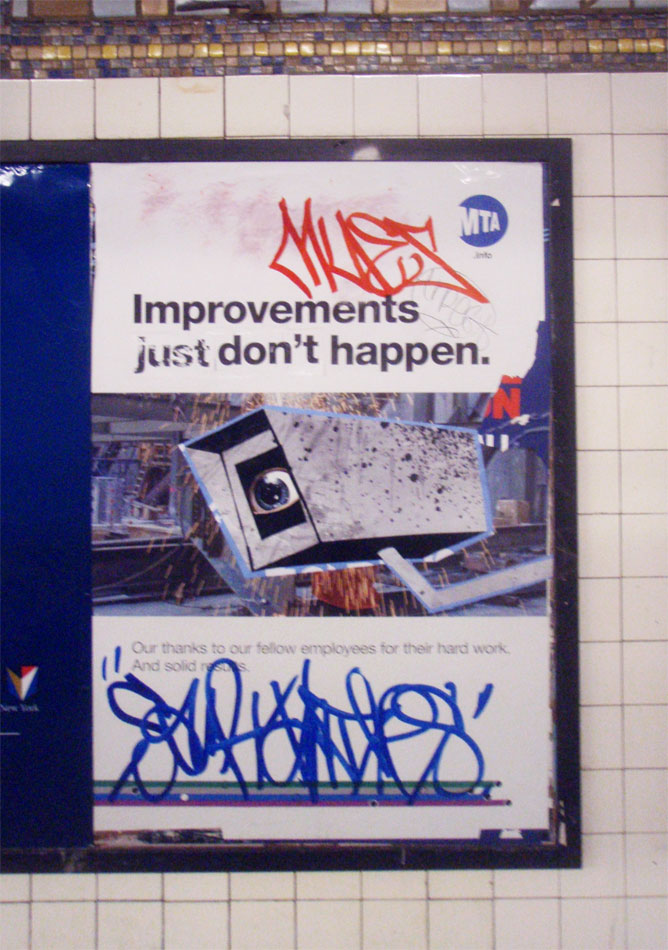
Graffiti critical of government surveillance in the New York City Subway

On January 11, 2021, the NYPD published details and policies regarding surveillance technologies in compliance to the POST (Public Oversight of Police Technology) act. The bill was passed by the New York City Counsel on June 18, 2020, intending to create "comprehensive reporting and oversight of NYPD surveillance technologies".

Although initially opposed by Mayor Bill de Blasio, in the wake of the 2020 George Floyd protests he signed off on the bill in a series of police reforms including displaying badge numbers and restrictions on the use of chokeholds. The POST act though enforcing the release of information regarding surveillance technology and personal data, does not restrict the usage or adopting of the technology itself.

Originally proposed to the New York City council in February 2018 by Daniel Garodnick and coauthored by sixteen other counsel-members, the act was opposed by the NYPD because they "cannot support a law that seems to be designed to help criminals and terrorists thwart efforts to stop them and endanger brave officers".

During initial discussions of the bill in 2017, Deputy Commissioner of Counterterrorism and Intelligence John Miller described the POST act as "insane", stating that "The way the bill is written right now it would be asking us to describe the specific manufacturer and model of an undercover recording device that an officer is wearing in an ongoing terror investigation". Chief of Detectives Robert K. Boyce also spoke against the bill, stating that it would give detailed information on the sex offender registry and domestic violence report system, which would then allow individuals to exploit or evade those systems.

New York City Council Black, Latino and Asian (BLA) Caucus endorsed the POST act in 2018, stating that the bill "disclose[s] basic information about its surveillance and the safeguards in place to protect the privacy and civil liberties of New Yorkers" and that "BLAC's endorsement highlights the threat that unchecked surveillance particularly poses to communities of color and Muslim and Immigrant New Yorkers."

The Brennan Center for Justice gave support for the bill, stating "None of the information required by the POST Act is granular enough to be of value to a potential terrorist or criminal [and] will not make surveillance tools any less effective." In their testimony to the New York City Council Committee on Public Safety, they officially supported the POST act, saying the goal of the act is to "have an informed conversation with policymakers and community stakeholders [...] before the NYPD deploys a new technology and before there is another alarming headline about police surveillance [and instead to have] up-front, constructive community input. It also encourages the NYPD to be thoughtful in how it approaches new surveillance technologies, so as not to engage in activities that harm individual rights, undermine its relationships with communities, or waste scarce resources".

==== Comptroller Audit of DAS ====
In 2013, the New York City Comptroller began an audit process of the Domain Awareness System, stating "The program does not have an outside monitor and it remains unclear whether it has ever been subjected to any internal audit to ensure access is protected and that it is not vulnerable to abuse or misuse." The audit concluded in 2015, and gave a report which included descriptions of how the NYPD was in compliance with regulations, and also points of concern in the system, including "individuals who were no longer NYPD employees whose DAS access had not been deactivated in the system" and that "Integrity Control Officers did not receive a standard set of criteria to use when reviewing DAS user activities and that the Integrity Control Officers had other responsibilities outside of the DAS system."

=== State governance ===
The New York State New York State Division of Criminal Justice Services published suggested guidelines for the usage of license plate readers within the state. This includes the recommendation of the creation of a "hot list" of license plates to be monitored, consisting of Gang members/associates, Sex offenders, Crime suspects, Fugitives and Search warrant targets.

== Licensing and exporting ==
Several large corporations are involved in developing the technology which composes the current surveillance systems in NYC, these include but are not limited to IBM, Microsoft and Palantir.

The Domain awareness system is licensed out by Microsoft to other cities, with New York City getting 30% of the profits. So far the system has been licensed by the Washington DC Metro Police, the Brazilian National Police, and the Singapore Police Force.

== See also ==
- Mass surveillance in China
- Mass surveillance in the United Kingdom
- Policing
- New York City Police Department corruption and misconduct
