= Moroccan Initiative =

New York City surveillance program

The Moroccan Initiative was a New York City Police Department (NYPD) surveillance program that targeted Moroccan immigrants in New York City. It started in response to the 2003 bombings in Casablanca, Morocco and 2004 Madrid train bombings that was linked to Moroccan terrorists, although the exact timeframe of the initiative is unknown.

The Moroccan Initiative was overseen by the NYPD's inaugural Deputy Commissioner of Intelligence, David Cohen, whose position was created by the city government in January 2002 in response to the September 11 attacks. Cohen had served for 35 years at the Central Intelligence Agency (CIA), which under President George W. Bush had assisted such programs, including the Moroccan Initiative. Although Cohen reported directly to Police Commissioner Raymond Kelly, who had appointed him intelligence chief, Kelly's degree of involvement or knowledge is unknown; it is also unclear whether Mayor Michael Bloomberg, who served from 2002 to 2013, oversaw the program. The NYPD denied engaging in a spying campaign.

The Moroccan Initiative sought to create a database on New York's Moroccan community, which at around 9,000 is the largest in the United States. Police were told there was no specific threat to New York from Moroccans but instructed to gather intelligence in the event Moroccan terrorists might strike the city; the resulting database was to be comprehensive enough to allow the NYPD act on any tip regarding an attack or threat from a Moroccan national. To that end, undercover officers cataloged the daily lives of Moroccans; photographed businesses frequented by Moroccans; eavesdropped on conversations; and in at least one occasion monitored an apartment where recent Moroccan immigrants lived.

The Moroccan Initiative was part of broader effort by the NYPD to gather intelligence on the local Muslim community, which included monitoring other ethnic neighborhoods and scrutinizing mosques. This was carried out by secretive team known as the Demographics Unit, composed of either eight or 16 officers. These activities are described as marking the NYPD's shift from a conventional law enforcement entity into a domestic intelligence agency following the September 11 attacks.
