= Overbrook Foundation =

American philanthropic organization

- Formation: April 1949; 77 years ago
- Founder: Frank Altschul
- Tax ID no.: 13-6088860
- Headquarters: New York
- President and CEO: Stephen A. Foster
- Revenue: $22.9 million (2024)
- Endowment: $13.2 million (2024)
- Website: www.overbrook.org

The Overbrook Foundation is a philanthropic organization, founded in 1949. Since its creation, it has donated more than $188 million to education and progressive causes.

== History ==
Frank and Helen Altschul created Overbrook to fund education causes including his alma mater, Yale University. Altschul was an early supporter of NPR.

After Altschul's death in 1981, the foundation hired professional management under the stewardship of family members.

== Major grants and initiatives ==
The foundation provides grants averaging $40,000 to causes including human rights and environmental causes primarily in the western hemisphere.

The foundation supports, for example, In Our Backyard, a crowdfunder of New York City environmental projects.

== Position on political contributions ==
In 2015, Overbrook joined with like-minded foundations including the Rockefeller Brothers Fund, the Ford Foundation, the Carnegie Corporation of New York, and the Turner Foundation to decry corporate contributions to political causes in the wake of the Citizens United v. FEC case.
