= Traffic and Environmental Zone =

Security and surveillance cordon in London

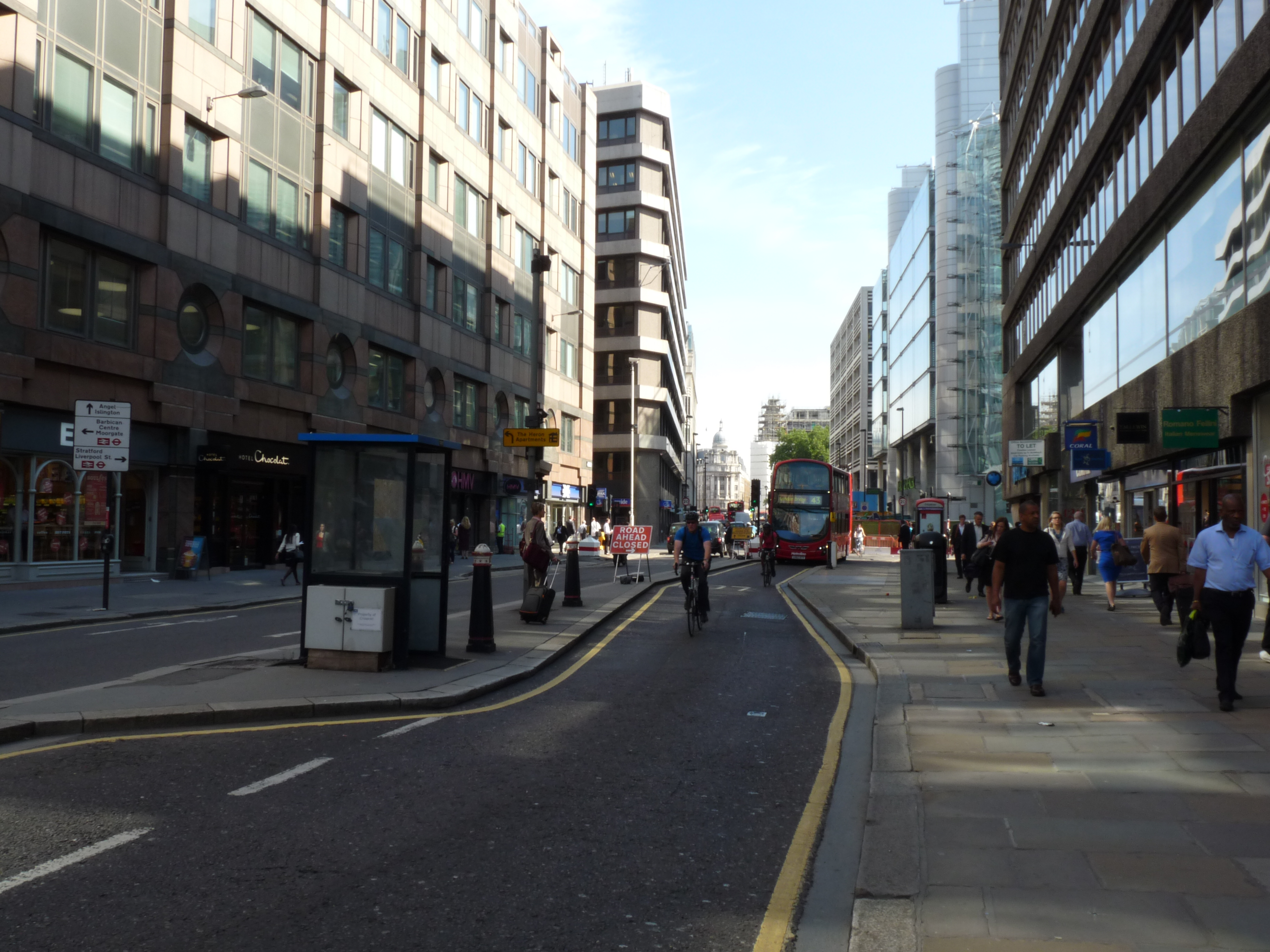
A checkpoint on Moorgate in July 2014, when it was not staffed. The road narrowing and slowing of traffic are visible.

The Traffic and Environmental Zone (TEZ), commonly known as the ring of steel, is the security and surveillance cordon consisting of road barriers, checkpoints and several hundred CCTV cameras surrounding the City of London, the financial district at the heart of Greater London. The measures have been used since the 1990s to deter terrorism and other threats.

== History and purpose ==
=== Introduction ===
The ring of steel measures were introduced by Owen Kelly, then the City of London Police commissioner, following the Provisional IRA bombing campaign in London in the 1980s and early 1990s, which included attacks within the City such as the 1992 Baltic Exchange and 1993 Bishopsgate attacks. The Traffic and Environmental Zone was officially established in 1993.

The term ring of steel was borrowed from an earlier stage of the Troubles when the centre of Belfast was fortified against attacks. This fortified perimeter was also known as the ring of steel.

Roads entering the City were narrowed, and small chicanes were created, to force drivers to slow down and be recorded by CCTV cameras. These roads typically had a concrete traffic island with a sentry box where police could stand guard and monitor traffic. City planners call these types of precautions "fortress urbanism". Some roads were closed to traffic entirely. Despite the term ring of steel, the roadblocks and chicanes were actually created with concrete blocks, sometimes plastic-coated, that were wedged together.

Initially, the sentry posts were almost continuously staffed by armed police. The ring of steel consisted of plastic cones and on-duty police officers, which the locals described as the "ring of plastic". It provided a sign to the public that City authorities were taking the threat of more IRA attacks seriously. This was replaced by more permanent structures consisting of concrete barriers, checkpoints and hundreds of video cameras. Following IRA ceasefires, the police presence was curtailed.

=== Late 1990s step-down ===
Staffed checkpoints began to be phased out after the IRA announced a ceasefire in 1994, and were no longer used after the 1990s.

=== Attacks outside the ring ===
In 1996, the IRA attacked another area of central London by exploding a bomb in Docklands, resulting in two deaths, 39 other casualties and £85 million worth of damage. The attack showed that even if the ring of steel were able to hinder attacks inside the City itself, terrorists could instead target other high-value areas such as the Docklands or Westminster.

=== Early 2000s step up ===
Following the September 11 attacks in the United States in 2001, and a reported increased terrorist threat to the United Kingdom, security was stepped up with occasional spot checks on vehicles entering the cordon, although not to previous levels. In December 2003, the ring of steel was widened to include more businesses in the City. This was as a direct result of a police report that categorised a terrorist attack on the City as "inevitable". Traffic entering the City is also monitored and recorded at the boundary of the London congestion charging zone, which covers a wider area.

=== 2016 proposals ===
In December 2016, re-introduction of staffed checkpoints, restricted roads, as well as rising street bollards and crash-proof barricades were proposed to combat "hostile vehicle-borne security threat[s]". The proposals were initially to be implemented by 2022, but as of 2024, no new construction has taken place.

== Number of CCTV cameras ==
According to a 2011 Freedom of Information Act request, the total number of local government-operated CCTV cameras in the City of London was 649.

The number of surveillance cameras that are part of the ring of steel is often wrongly quoted as 500,000. This figure relates to Greater London, which has an area of 1,572 km^{2} (607 sq mi) compared with the square mile (3 km²) of the City of London that the ring of steel covers. It has been acknowledged for several years that the methodology behind this figure is flawed, but it has been widely quoted.

The figure of 500,000 comes from a 2002 study by Michael McCahill and Clive Norris of UrbanEye. Based on a small sample in Putney High Street, McCahill and Norris extrapolated the number of surveillance cameras in Greater London to be 500,000 and in the UK to be 4.2 million. More reliable estimates put the total number of private and local government surveillance cameras in the whole of the UK at around 1.85 million in 2011.

== See also ==
- Automatic number-plate recognition in the United Kingdom
- Lower Manhattan Security Initiative
- Mass surveillance in the United Kingdom
