= Hugh Price (intelligence) =

Hugh E. "Ted" Price is a former Deputy Director for Operations of the U.S. Central Intelligence Agency and is currently the chairman of Lehman Brothers India.

Price graduated from Yale before serving five years in the United States Marine Corps. While with the CIA he served in Thailand, Taiwan, Myanmar, Hong Kong, Singapore, Ethiopia and China. Price held the positions of Station chief, Director of Personnel, Director of Counterintelligence from 1992-1994, as well as Deputy Director for Operations. In 1994, he received a letter of reprimand over his role in the Aldrich Ames spy case while director of counterintelligence.

After leaving the Central Intelligence Agency, Price joined the private security business Kroll Inc. as head of its crisis management group. He joined Lehman Brothers in December 2001 as head of Global Security.

In 2005 Price married Lisa Spiro, former communications head at Salomon Brothers and UBS.

Government offices
Preceded by Thomas A. Twetten	CIA Deputy Director for Operations; January 1994–1995	Succeeded by David Cohen
