= General American Investors Company =

- Company type: Closed-end fund
- Traded as: NYSE: GAM
- Industry: Investment
- Founded: 1927; 99 years ago
- Founders: Lazard Frères and Lehman Brothers
- Headquarters: New York City, United States
- Key people: Spencer Davidson (President)
- Products: Investment fund
- Website: generalamericaninvestors.com

The General American Investors Company, Inc. is a closed-end fund that manages a global portfolio of investments, consisting mainly of United States securities, and also some international and private securities.

== History ==
The General American Investors investment trust was launched in 1927 under the sponsorship of Lazard Frères and Lehman Brothers. In its first year of operation, it earned $1.1 million. In September 1928, Lazard Frères and Lehman Brothers launched a second fund, named the Second General American Investors Company. In August 1928, the two funds merged, to form the current General American Investors Company, with Lazard Frères and Lehman Brothers underwriting the $40 million deal.

The early years of the Great Depression were difficult for the fund, but the fund recovered as the 1930s progressed. The fund had assets valued at $15 million in 1932; at $23.1 million in 1933; and $30.1 million in 1935. Assets dropped to $24.7 million in 1937; $30 million in 1939; then dropped to $25.5 million in 1943; dropping slightly to $25.3 million in 1945.

== Leadership ==
=== Chairmen of the General American Investors Company ===
- Frank Altschul, 1948-1961
- Arthur G. Altschul, 1961–1995
- Lawrence B. Buttenwieser, 1995–2007
- Spencer Davidson, 2007–Present

=== Presidents / Portfolio Managers of the Fund ===
- Frank Altschul, 1927–1948
- Harold F. Linder, 1948–1955
- Harry G. Friedman, 1955–1961
- Malcolm B. Smith, 1961–1989
- William J. Gedale, 1989–1995
- Spencer Davidson, 1995–Present
