= Rebecca Weiner =

American intelligence and counterterrorism officer

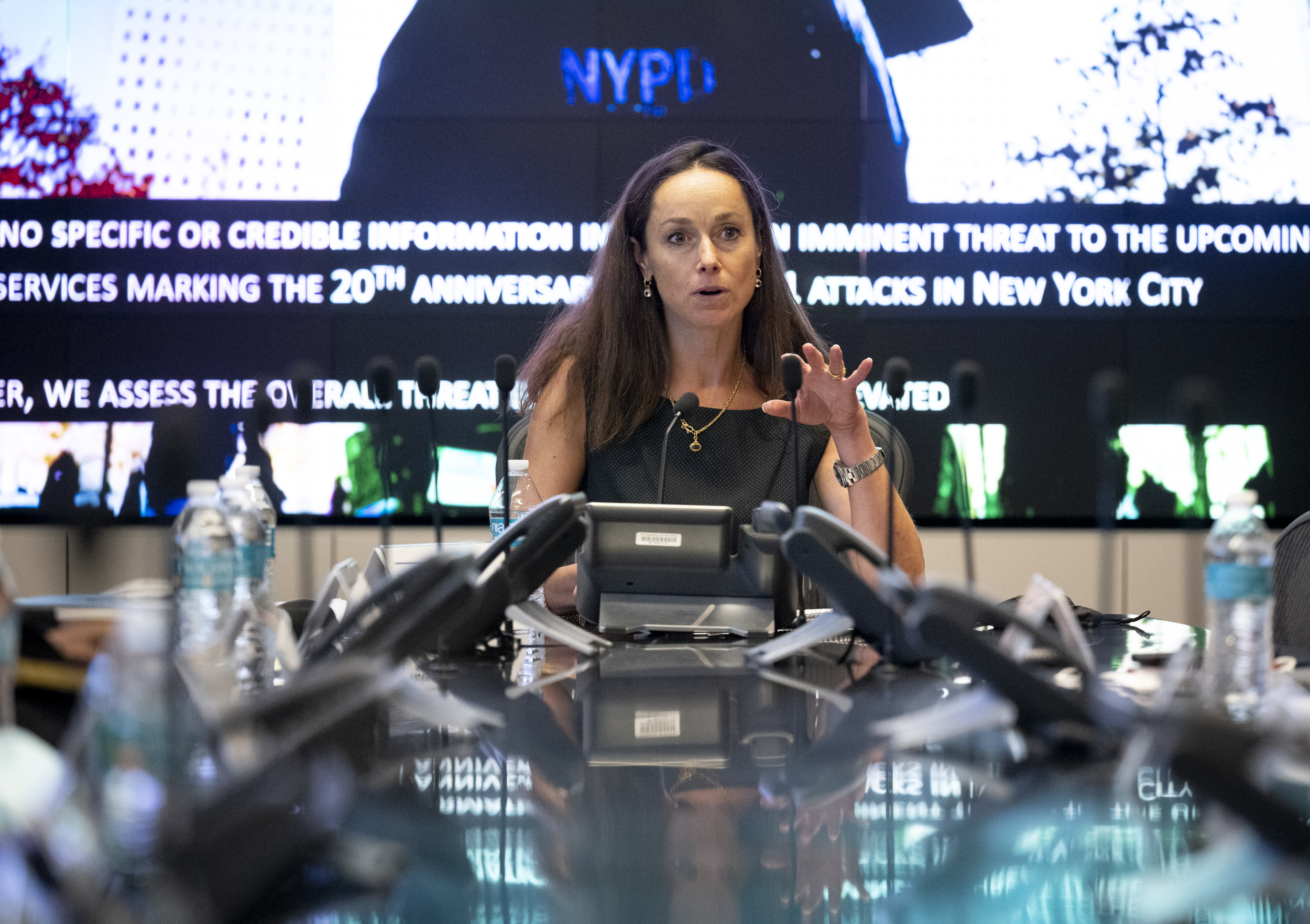

NYPD Deputy Commissioner of Intelligence and Counterterrorism
- Incumbent
- Assumed office July 19, 2023
- Appointed by: Edward Caban
- Serving under: New York City Police Commissioner
- Preceded by: Thomas Galati

NYPD Assistant Commissioner of Intelligence and Counterterrorism
- In office 2016–2023

NYPD ICB Director of Intelligence Analysis
- In office 2012–2016

Personal details
- Born: c. 1977 New Mexico
- Relations: Stanislaw Ulam (grandfather)
- Education: Harvard College; Harvard Law School; Harvard University; Harvard Kennedy School; Belfer Center for Science and International Affairs

Rebecca Ulam Weiner is the highest-ranking intelligence officer at the New York Police Department, a professor, and a member of Council on Foreign Relations.

Within the New York City Police Department Weiner is the current Deputy Commissioner of the Intelligence and Counterterrorism Bureau (ICB.) The bureau, created in the wake of the September 11 attacks, is also known as NYPD Intel, for its practices during the Global War On Terror (GWOT). The bureau was only made public knowledge after being disclosed by the Associated Press in 2011, which won the journalists a Pulitzer Prize for Investigative Reporting. Weiner is the first woman to run the bureau.

As Adam Ciralsky wrote for Vanity Fair:

Weiner has access to a legion of intelligence analysts, counterassault and dignitary-protection teams, a flotilla of boats, radiation-sniffing and surveillance aircraft, the nation’s biggest bomb squad, a counter-drone unit, a remote contingent of NYPD detectives stationed in 13 cities overseas, and a network of multilingual undercover operatives who subvert malicious actors across the US and around the world.

Despite her high-ranking position, Weiner has never served as a beat cop or patrol officer, a path also followed by her predecessor, John Miller. She first joined the NYPD as an intelligence analyst in 2006. At that time, she was one of only a few female intelligence analysts working for the entire NYPD.

She is an adjunct assistant professor at Columbia’s School for International and Public Affairs. Her position in the NYPD superseded her academic position here during the student demonstrations on the campus in late March, 2024. She was responsible for coordinating police intelligence activities during the protest, which led to the arrest of 300 students. She stated that the protests were encouraged by what she called "outside agitators."
