= Siri von Reis =

American botanist, author and poet (1931–2021)

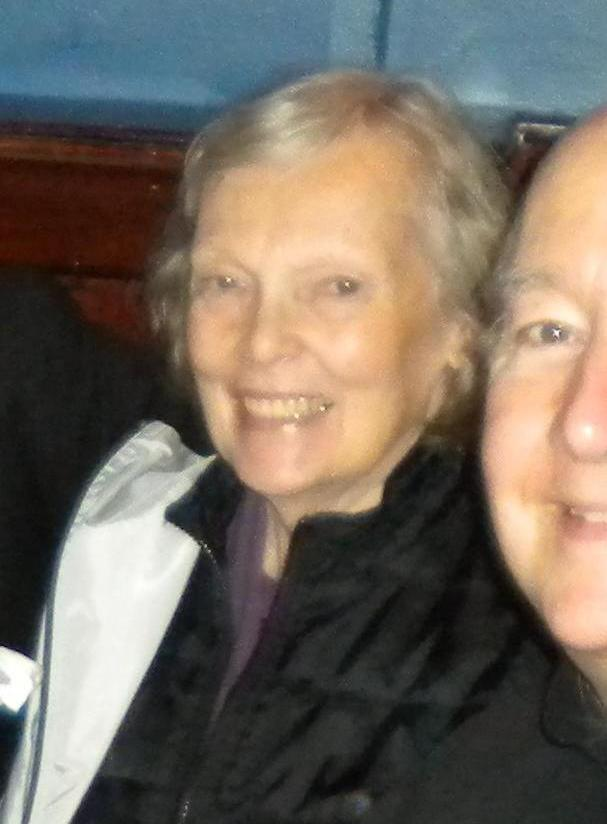
- Siri von Reis in 2011 at the Metropolitan Room in Manhattan
- Born: Siri Sylvia Patricia von Reis; February 10, 1931
- Died: August 3, 2021 (aged 90)
- Education: University of Michigan
- Occupations: botanist, author, and poet
- Spouse(s): Arthur Altschul (m. 1963; div. 1972)
- Children: 3, including Serena Altschul

Siri Sylvia Patricia von Reis (February 10, 1931 – August 3, 2021) was an American botanist, author, and poet of half-Finnish and half-Swedish ancestry. She was an authority on traditional medicine. She was also an investigator at the New York Botanical Garden.

== Personal life ==
Siri von Reis was the daughter of Bror Gustav von Reis (1903–1975), the president of Detroit Broach and Machine Company of Rochester, Michigan, and Donna Tavastila von Reis (1908–1994). She received a bachelor's degree in botany from the University of Michigan in 1953. After breaking off an engagement to the electronics executive Arthur G. B. Metcalf in 1959, she married the banker Arthur Goodhart Altschul, a Goldman Sachs Group partner and member of the Lehman banking family. They had three children together, Arthur Jr. (born 1964), Emily Helen (born 1966), and broadcast journalist Serena Altschul (born 1970), before their divorce in 1972.

== Bibliography ==
- Schultes, R.E.; Altschul, S. 2005: Ethnobotany: The Evolution of a Discipline
- Reis, Siri von 2001: The Love-Suicides at Sonezaki and other Poems
- Altschul, S.; Lipp, F.J.Jr. 1982: New Plant Sources for Drugs and Foods from the New York Botanical Garden Herbarium
- Altschul, S. 1977: Exploring the Herbarium.
- Altschul, S. 1975. Drugs & Foods From Little-Known Plants - Notes in Harvard University Herbaria
- Altschul, S. 1972: The Genus Anadenanthera in Amerindian Cultures
