= New York City Police Department Counterterrorism Bureau =

Division of the New York City Police Department

- Flag of the New York City Police Department
- Abbreviation: CT
- Motto: Fidelis ad Mortem; Faithful till Death

Agency overview
- Preceding agency: Municipal Police

Jurisdictional structure
- Operations jurisdiction: New York, New York, United States
- Map of New York City Police Department Counterterrorism Bureau's jurisdiction
- Area: 468.9 square miles (1,214 km^{2})
- Legal jurisdiction: New York City

Operational structure
- Headquarters: One Police Plaza
- Deputy Commissioner responsible: Rebecca U. Weiner
- Agency executives: Ruel R. Stephenson, Assistant Chief of Counterterrorism; David A. Wall, Deputy Chief of Counterterrorism
- Parent agency: New York City Police Department
- Boroughs: List: Manhattan North; Manhattan South; Brooklyn North; Brooklyn South; Queens North; Queens South; Bronx East; Bronx West; Staten Island

Website
- www1.nyc.gov/site/nypd/bureaus/investigative/counterterrorism.page

The New York City Police Department Counterterrorism Bureau (CT) is a division of the New York City Police Department (NYPD) responsible for preventing terrorist attacks within New York City. Former New York City Police Commissioner Raymond Kelly described the CT as "a Council on Foreign Relations with guns".

In 2023, the counterterrorism and intelligence bureaus were merged into one bureau, under the supervision of Deputy Commissioner Rebecca U. Weiner. After the merger, Intelligence and Counterterrorism operate as 2 divisions under the combined bureau. Each division is commanded by an Assistant Chief or a Deputy Chief.

== Current subdivisions ==
=== Critical Response Command (CRC) ===
Critical Response Command (CRC) is one of the Department's first lines of defense against a terrorist-related attack. A permanent cadre of hand-selected police officers devoted to counterterrorism, CRC members are trained to respond swiftly, with sufficient expertise and force, to the most highly organized and heavily armed attacks. All CRC team members are trained in special weapons and long-range guns, explosive trace detection, radiological and nuclear awareness, biological and chemical weapons awareness, and are equipped with the skills to detect an impending attack and utilize the best possible response to an emerging situation. The team conducts daily counterterrorism deployments to critical infrastructure sites throughout New York City, saturating strategic locations with a uniform presence to disrupt and deter terrorist planning and hostile surveillance operations.

=== Counterterrorism Division ===
The counterterrorism division oversees a range of activities including:

- The Technology and Construction Section which designs counterterrorism projects.
- The Training Section which provides counterterrorism training.
- The Threat Reduction Infrastructure Protection Section (TRIPS) which develops specific defensive strategies for various locations in the city.
- The Chemical, Biological, Radiological, Nuclear, and Explosives (CBRNE) Section which conducts tests and research on new counterterrorism technologies.
- The Maritime Team, which designs counterterrorism systems for the city's harbors, this includes the Tactical Radiological Acquisition Characterization System (TRACS) which maps background radiation.
- The NYPD SHIELD Unit which provides information and training to the public on counterterrorism.
- The Emergency Preparedness and Exercise Section, which liaises with the NYC Office of Emergency Management.

=== Joint terrorist task force (JTTF) ===
The JTTF is a national security force which includes both members of the NYPD and the FBI, and operates both within New York City and globally. This partnership allows nationally classified documents to be used by the NYPD, and for local information to be shared at the national level.

=== Terrorism threat analysis group ===
The Terrorism Threat Analysis Group is responsible for the analysis and sharing of intelligence to various agencies including other police departments.

=== World Trade Center command ===
The World Trade Center command provides security around the World Trade Center.

== See also ==
- Police surveillance in New York City
- New York City Police Department Intelligence Bureau
- Organization of the New York City Police Department
