= Frank Altschul =

American financier

- Born: April 21, 1887; San Francisco
- Died: May 29, 1981 (aged 94)
- Education: B.A. Yale University
- Occupation: Banker
- Known for: Senior partner at Lazard Freres & Company; Executive at General American Investors Company; Overbrook Management Corporation (founder)
- Spouse: Helen Lehman Goodhart
- Children: Margaret Altschul Lang; Edith Altschul Graham; Arthur G. Altschul
- Parent(s): Camilla Mandlebaum Altschul; Charles Altschul

Frank Altschul (April 21, 1887 – May 29, 1981) was an American financier at General American Investors Company, and founder of the Overbrook Management Corporation.

== Early life ==
Altschul was born to a Jewish family in San Francisco, the son of Camilla (née Mandlebaum) and Charles Altschul. His father had immigrated to the United States from London in 1877 and was the eighth employee of the San Francisco bank Lazard Freres. In 1901, the Altschul family moved to New York City. In 1908, Altschul graduated from Yale University.

== Career ==
He joined Lazard Freres in 1908 and served in France as an Army captain during World War I. In 1916, his father retired as partner at Lazard and Altschul took his place in the firm as one of five partners. In the 1920s, he was awarded the Legion of Honor by the government of France after giving successful advice on how to stabilize the French franc. In the 1930s, he was part of the committee that governs the New York Stock Exchange before moving on to work with the Chase National Bank. In 1934, he established Overbrook Press which specialized in illustrated, limited edition books for collectors. In 1943, Altschul began working with Lazard Freres as a senior partner. Later he moved on again to General American Investors Company, and maintained his position as an executive until his retirement in 1961.

He founded the private family office, Overbrook Management Corporation, to manage and protect the wealth and financial well-being of the Altschul Family. In 2002, the office opened its doors to provide asset management and related services to institutional investors and high net worth individuals. Over the years, Overbrook's leadership passed to his son, Arthur Altschul, and then to his grandson, Arthur Goodhart Altschul Jr, who currently serves as Overbrook's Chairman.

== Philanthropy ==
In 1924, Altschul co-founded the Yale Library Associates, responsible for overseeing Yale libraries. Between 1961 and 1964, he also made financial contributions to various colleges and universities to establish professorships, including his alma mater Yale University and Williams College. Altschul served as director of the English-Speaking Union, vice president of the Woodrow Wilson Foundation, and as vice president and secretary of the Council on Foreign Relations.

Frank Altschul also maintained a family project, the Overbrook Foundation. In the summer of 1958, when author William L. Shirer was "flat broke" and desperate for funds that would permit him to finish writing The Rise and Fall of the Third Reich, at the recommendation of Hamilton Fish Armstrong the Overbrook Foundation advanced immediately to Shirer $5,000 ($52,500 in 2024 dollars) and promised another $5,000 six months later, enabling Shirer to finish his monumental book. In the third volume of his autobiography, Shirer writes: "This saved my life and my book . . . and I settled back to fourteen hours a day of writing."

== Personal life ==
He was married to Helen Lehman Goodhart, granddaughter of Mayer Lehman, niece of Herbert H. Lehman, former United States Senator and Governor of New York (who his sister Edith married), and sister to Arthur Lehman Goodhart. They had three children: Margaret Lang (married to journalist Daniel Lang), Edith Graham, and Arthur G. Altschul. Altschul was a registered Republican who served twice as a Connecticut delegate to his party's national conventions; although he supported Adlai Stevenson II in his 1952 Presidential race against Dwight D. Eisenhower.
