= David Cohen (intelligence) =

American intelligence officer

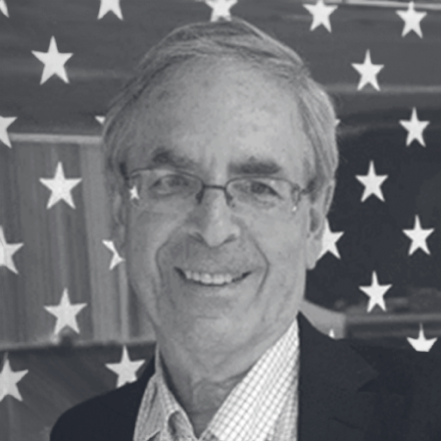

Deputy Commissioner of the NYPD Intelligence and Counterterrorism Bureau
- In office 2002–2013
- Preceded by: Position established
- Succeeded by: John Miller

Deputy Director of CIA for Operations
- In office 1995–1997
- Preceded by: Hugh E. Price
- Succeeded by: Jack G. Downing

David Cohen is an American intelligence and law enforcement official. A 35-year career in the Central Intelligence Agency culminated in service as the Deputy Director of CIA for Operations from 1995 to 1997. After retiring from CIA, he was the inaugural Deputy Commissioner of Intelligence of the New York City Police Department, serving in this role from 2002 to 2013.

== Biography ==
Cohen spent 35 years in the Central Intelligence Agency (CIA), including serving as Deputy Director of CIA for Operations (DDO) from 1995 to 1997. Following his career in the CIA, Cohen was in charge of the Global Political Risk program for insurer AIG.

Shortly after Raymond Kelly was appointed NYPD Commissioner in January 2002, he called Cohen. Cohen spoke with AIG Chairman Hank Greenberg, and joined the NYPD within an hour.

In January 2002, Cohen was appointed the NYPD's inaugural Deputy Commissioner of Intelligence, reporting directly to Kelly. The post was created by the city government in response to the September 11 attacks. At the helm, Cohen pushed the NYPD to focus more on analyzing data and reaching out to foreign police departments by stationing officers abroad.

Cohen retired from the NYPD in December 2013 and was succeeded by former CBS correspondent John Miller.

In February 2022, as a consultant with Evolv Technology, Cohen helped to introduce a controversial AI gun-detection program to the NYPD. He presently maintains a position on Evolv's security advisory board.
