= Lawrence Sanchez =

Former Central Intelligence Agency officer

Lawrence 'Larry' Sanchez is a former Central Intelligence Agency officer and security consultant. After the September 11 attacks he was seconded by the CIA to the New York City Police Department where he helped establish a controversial program for surveillance of the city's Muslim population.

== History ==
While in the Central Intelligence Agency Sanchez spent 15 years overseas in the Soviet Union, South Asia, and the Middle East.

In 2002 he was sent to the New York City Police Department by the Directorate of Central Intelligence to "improve analytic information-handling capabilities of law enforcement entities in the States of New York and New Jersey," according to an inspector-general report. He was a conduit channeling CIA intelligence from abroad to the New York police.

He picked an NYPD detective to attend the CIA's training facility at Camp Peary; the detective completed the course but failed to graduate and returned to the police department. While under Sanchez's direction the NYPD's Cyber Intelligence Unit also conducted training sessions for the CIA. In 2003 he created the 'Demographics Unit' which surveyed areas with Muslim populations.

In 2004 he took a temporary leave of absence from the CIA to become deputy to David Cohen, the head of the NYPD intelligence division.

In 2007, as a senior NYPD official, Sanchez testified before a Senate Committee on Homeland Security and Governmental Affairs. He said, "Rather than just protecting New York City citizens from terrorists, the New York Police Department believes part of its mission is to protect New York City citizens from turning into terrorists." In 2010 he left the NYPD.

=== United Arab Emirates ===
Since leaving the NYPD, Sanchez has worked as a security consultant in the Middle East. Since 2011, he has been working for Mohammed bin Zayed Al Nahyan, the crown prince of Abu Dhabi in the United Arab Emirates, to build the emirate's intelligence services. Sanchez built his relationship with the Emirates while at the NYPD. In 2008, the NYPD and the UAE entered an intelligence-sharing deal and the NYPD established an office in Abu Dhabi. The UAE also gave the New York City Police Foundation $1million for its intelligence division in 2012.
