= Bronfman =

Bronfman is a surname. The name is Yiddish in origin and originally referred to a dealer in distilled liquor (Yiddish bronfn).

Notable people with the surname include:

- Bronfman family, Jewish-Canadian-American, owners of Seagram
  - Adam Bronfman (born 1963), president of the Samuel Bronfman Foundation, son of Edgar Sr.
  - Charles Bronfman (born 1931) Canadian-American businessman and son of Samuel
  - Clare Bronfman (born 1979), former leader of NXIVM and convicted fellon; daughter of Edgar Sr.
  - Edgar Bronfman Sr. (1929–2013), Canadian-American businessman and former Seagram CEO; son of Samuel
  - Edgar Bronfman Jr. (born 1955), American businessman and former Seagram CEO; son of Edgar Sr.
  - Edward Bronfman (1927–2005)
  - Matthew Bronfman (born 1959), American businessman, entrepreneur and philanthropist; son of Edgar Sr.
  - Saidye Rosner Bronfman (1897–1995), wife of Samuel
  - Samuel Bronfman (1889–1971), Bessarabia born founder of Canadian business family
  - Sara Bronfman (born 1976), member of the leadership team for NXIVM; daughter of Edgar Sr.
- Hannah Bronfman (born 1987), American DJ, influencer, and entrepreneur
- Leonid Izrailevich Bronfman (born 1932), Moldavian Soviet engineer, mechanic, inventor; later migrated to Israel
- Roman Bronfman (born 1954), Ukraine-born Israeli politician
- Yefim Bronfman (born 1958), Uzbek-born Israeli-American pianist
