= Edgar Bronfman =

Edgar Bronfman may refer to:

- Edgar Bronfman Sr. (1929–2013), Canadian businessman and long-time president of the World Jewish Congress
- Edgar Bronfman Jr. (born 1955), American businessman and CEO of the Warner Music Group

== See also ==
- Bronfman family
