= Adam Bronfman =

American philanthropist (born 1963)

- Born: Adam Rodgers Bronfman; 1963 (age 62–63); New York City, U.S.
- Occupation: Philanthropist
- Spouse: Cindy Bronfman
- Children: 4
- Parent(s): Edgar Bronfman Sr. Ann Loeb
- Relatives: Edgar Bronfman Jr. (brother); Matthew Bronfman (brother); Samuel Bronfman (grandfather); John Langeloth Loeb Sr. (grandfather); Nicholas M. Loeb (cousin)

Adam Rodgers Bronfman (born 1963) is an American philanthropist and scion of the Bronfman family. He currently serves as president of the Samuel Bronfman Foundation, named in honor of his grandfather, Samuel Bronfman. He is involved in Jewish outreach and advocates "a pluralistic and open Judaism."

== Early life ==
Born in 1963, Adam is the son of Edgar Miles Bronfman and the grandson of Samuel Bronfman, patriarch of the Bronfman family, a Jewish family that gained its fortunes through the Seagram Company, an alcohol distilling company. Adam is the youngest of five children of Ann (Loeb) and Edgar Miles Bronfman. His mother was also from a Jewish family, the daughter of John Langeloth Loeb Sr. (a Wall Street investment banker whose company was a predecessor of Shearson Lehman/American Express) and Frances Lehman (a scion of the Lehman Brothers banking firm). She was also the great-granddaughter of Adolph Lewisohn. His parents divorced in 1973. His brother, Samuel Bronfman II was abducted for ransom in 1975. He also has two half-sisters, Sara and Clare Bronfman from his father's second marriage. He was more committed to Jewish traditions than his siblings and was the only one of his mother's five children to have a bar mitzvah. He was educated at the Taft School in Connecticut, where he convinced the school's administration to change the grace said before meals so to make non-Christian students more comfortable. He then majored in religion at Pomona College.

== Career ==
Bronfman had an estranged relationship with his father, Edgar Bronfman Sr.; however, they reconnected on a trip to Brazil in 2003. Adam began to work alongside his father with the Samuel Bronfman Foundation, where he defines and narrows his father's philanthropic vision and furthers his own commitment to Jewish learning, religious pluralism and communal outreach. He has spoken of the importance of bringing interfaith families back into Jewish communities, and the opportunities for growing non-Orthodox Jewish congregations. He also criticized a proposed Jewish conversion bill in Israel that would favour Orthodox Judaism over the Reform and Conservative branches.

In 2004, he joined the board of Hillel International and helped to establish the Hillel in Santa Barbara, California. He visits Hillels across North America as part of his work with the campus organization. He was very involved with establishing Temple Ha Shalom, a burgeoning Reform synagogue in Park City, Utah. He funded the synagogue building and also endows the Saidye Rosner Bronfman Rabbinic Chair, honoring his grandmother. Through the Samuel Bronfman Foundation he has also worked to make the synagogue a destination for Jewish groups. He brought 22 leading Jewish scholars, politicians, journalists and organizational leaders to discuss the themes of Jewish identity, peoplehood and continuity.

In 2023, he was among 15 major donors and foundations, including his uncle Charles Bronfman and the Samuel Bronfman Foundation, to publish an open letter urging Prime Minister Benjamin Netanyahu to reconsider the 2023 Israeli judicial reform

== Personal life ==
Bronfman is married to Cindy, with whom he has four children. They raised their children in Adam's Jewish faith and Cindy has since converted to Judaism. They have homes in Phoenix, Arizona, Park City, Utah and Manhattan. They are members of Temple Har Shalom, a Reform synagogue in Park City. He previously taught at the synagogue's Hebrew school when his children were younger and he continues to study Jewish texts regularly.
