= Lehman family =

Jewish German-American family

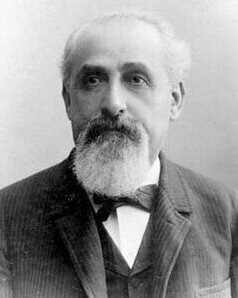
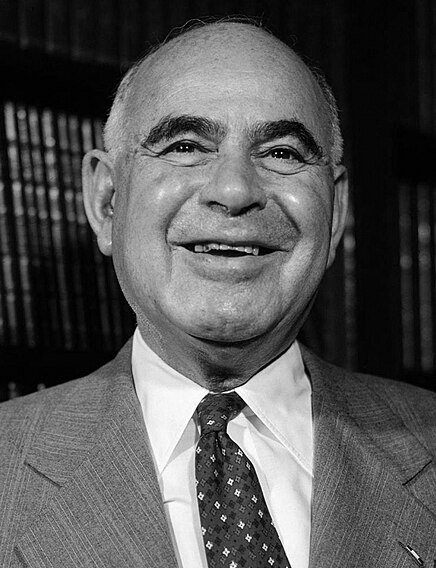
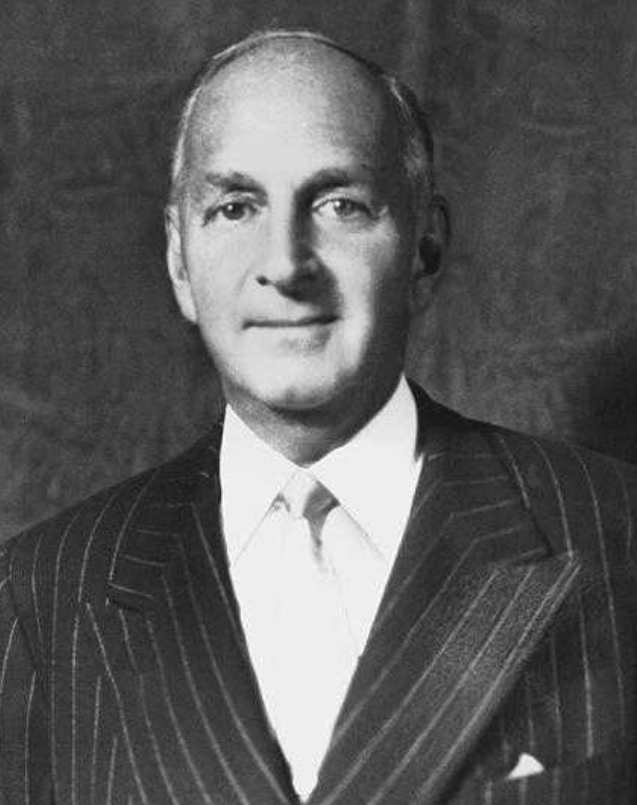
- Mayer Lehman Herbert Henry Lehman Robert Lehman
- Current region: New York, U.S.
- Origin: Bavaria, Germany
- Founder: Abraham Lehman
- Connected families: Bronfman family; Loeb family

The Lehman family (also Lehmann, Liehmann or Liehman) is a prominent family of Jewish German-Americans who founded the financial firm Lehman Brothers. Some were also involved in American politics. Members have married into the prominent Morgenthau, Loeb, and Bronfman families.

The family traces back to Abraham Lehmann, a cattle merchant in Rimpar, Bavaria, who changed his Yiddish (German-Jewish) surname Löw (Loeb) to the German Lehman.

== Family tree ==
Some of the family members include:

- Abraham Lehmann, born Abraham Löw, cattle merchant in Rimpar, Bavaria
  - Zeira Lehmann Schloss (1810–1902), remained in Germany
  - Berta Low Lehmann Schwab (born 1812), remained in Germany
  - Seligmann Lehmann (1814–1890), remained in Germany
  - Fratel Lehmann (1817–1817), died as a newborn
  - Anna Lehmann Roman (born 1820), remained in Germany
  - Henry Lehman (1822–1855), born Hayum Lehmann, founder of H. Lehman, which became Lehman Brothers, married to Rosa Wolf, 4 children
    - Bertha Lehman Rosenheim
    - Harriet Lehman Weil, married Moses Weil, 5 children
      - Leon Weil
      - Blanche Weil
      - Hannah Weil
      - Harry L. Weil
      - Elsie Rose Weil, married Leon Weil, 2 children
        - Helen Weil Benjamin (1905–1996)
        - George Leon Weil (1907–1995), nuclear physicist
    - David Lehman
    - Meyer H. Lehman
  - Emanuel Lehman (1827–1907), born Mendel Lehmann, co-founder of Lehman Brothers, married to Pauline Sondheim (1843–1871), 4 children
    - Milton Lehman
    - Harriet Philip Lehman, married her cousin Sigmund M. Lehman, son of her uncle Mayer Lehman
    - Evelyn Philip Lehman, married Jules Ehrich, 4 children:
      - May Ehrich (born 1889)
      - Pauline Ehrich (born 1893), married Monroe Gutman
      - Dorothy Ehrich (born 1895), married John C. Mayer, 3 children
        - Jane Mayer (born 1919), married Harold Field
        - John Mayer (born 1921), married Dale Shoup, daughter of economist Carl Shoup (1902–2000) and granddaughter of businessman Paul Shoup (1874–1946)
        - William Mayer (1925–2017), composer, married Meredith Nevins, daughter of historian and journalist Allan Nevins (1890–1971), 3 children
          - Steven Mayer (born 1952)
          - Jane Mayer (born 1955), journalist, married to William B. Hamilton
          - Cynthia Mayer (born 1958)
      - Ruth Ehrich (born 1900), married Ralph Friedman, 2 children
    - Philip Lehman (1861–1947), married to Carrie Lauer (born 1937)
      - Pauline Lehman, married to Henry Ickelheimer (1868–1940) of Heidelbach, Ickelheimer & Co., 2 children
        - Jean Ickelheimer Stralem, married to Donald Stralem (1903–1976), 2 children
          - Sandra Jean Stralem, married Robert A. Russell, 2 children
            - Donna Russell Cronin
            - Robin Becker Maki
          - Sharon Lynn Stralem married Ralph Albee Phraner Jr.
        - Philip Henry Isles (1912–1960), changed surname from Ickelheimer, married to model Lillian Fox, 3 children, divorced, she remarried Stephane Groueff (1922–2006)
          - Jill Isles Blanchard, married to Guillermo B. Aguilera, divorced and remarried to Richard F. Blanchard.
            - Pauline Aguilera Longano (born 1967), married to Nicholas Longano (born 1965) in 1998
          - Tina Isles Barney (born 1945), photographer, married to John Joseph Barney in 1966
          - Philip Henry Isles II, married to Alexandra Moltke (born 1945)
            - Adam Isles (born 1969), married to Hannah Harrison Bond
      - Robert Lehman (1891–1969), married three times
        - married Ruth S. (née Lamar) Rumsey (born 1902) in 1929, divorced 1931, no children
        - married Ruth "Kitty" (Leavitt) Meeker (1904–1984), daughter of William Homer Leavitt (1868–1951) and Ruth Bryan Owen (1885–1954), and granddaughter of United States Secretary of State, William Jennings Bryan (1860–1925); 1 child
          - Robert Owen ("Robin") Lehman (born 1936), married to Aki Lehman, 2 children, before marrying music theorist Marie Rolf, 2 children
            - Philip Lehman (born 1965)
            - Kate Lehman
            - Rolf Lehman
            - Morgan Lehman
        - married Lee "Elena" (Anz) Lynn (1919–2006) in 1952; no children
  - Aaron Lehman (1829–1924)
  - Mayer Lehman (1830–1897), co-founder of Lehman Brothers, married to Babette Newgass, sister-in-law of Isaias W. Hellman (1842–1920)
    - Lisette Lehman Fatman, married to Morris Fatman, clothing manufacturer, 2 children
      - Margaret Fatman married to composer Werner Josten (1885–1963), 2 children
        - Peter Josten
        - Eileen Josten Lowe, married Dr. Charles U. Lowe in 1955, 4 children
      - Elinor Fatman Morgenthau (1892–1949), married Henry Morgenthau Jr. (1891–1967), U.S. Secretary of the Treasury, 3 children
        - Robert M. Morgenthau (1919–2019), District Attorney for New York County
        - Henry Morgenthau III (1917–2018), author and television producer, married Ruth Schachter Morgenthau (1931–2006), advisor to President Jimmy Carter, 3 children
          - Henry (Ben) Morgenthau (born 1964)
          - Kramer Morgenthau (born 1966), cinematographer, married Tracy Fleischman in 2011
          - Sarah Elinor Morgenthau Wessel (born 1963), married to Carlton Wessel in 1993
        - Joan Morgenthau Hirschhorn (1922–2012) married Fred Hirschhorn Jr. in 1957, 3 children
          - Elizabeth Hirschhorn Wilson, married Bruce Wilson
          - Joan Hirschhorn Bright, married David Bright
          - Elinor H. Hirschhorn, married Michael J. Carroll in 1996
    - Clara Lehman Limburg
      - Mabel Limburg Rossbach married to Max J. H. Rossbach
        - June Bingham Birge (1919–2007), married U.S. Congressman Jonathan Brewster Bingham (1914–1986), four children; remarried to Robert B. Birge in 1987, no children
          - Sherrell Bingham Downes
          - Timothy Woodbridge Bingham
          - Claudia Bingham Meyers
          - June Mitchell Esselstyn (1942–1999) married Erik C. Esselstyn, 2 children
            - June Eriksson (Jody) Esselstyn
            - Blakeman Bingham Esselstyn
    - Sigmund M. Lehman married his cousin Harriet Philip Lehman, daughter of his uncle Emanuel Lehman
      - Allan S. Lehman married Evelyn Schiffer
        - Ellen Lehman Long
        - Orin Lehman (1920–2008)
      - Harold M. Lehman, married Cecile R. Seligman, 2 daughters
        - Betty Lehman Asiel married to E. Nelson Asiel, 3 children
          - Harold N. Asiel
          - Terri L. Grammas
          - John H. Asiel
        - Susan Lehman, married Joseph Cullman (1912–2004) in 1935, one daughter.
          - Dorothy Cullman Treisman
    - Harriet Lehman (1860–1948), married to Philip Goodhart
      - Arthur Lehman Goodhart (1891–1978), British academic; married Cecily Carter, 3 children
        - Philip Goodhart (1925–2015), British politician; married Valerie Forbes Winant, niece of John Gilbert Winant (1889–1947); 7 children
          - Arthur Goodhart
          - Sarah Goodhart
          - David Goodhart (born 1956), journalist; married to journalist Lucy Kellaway (born 1959); 4 children
          - Rachel Goodhart
          - Harriet Goodhart
          - Rebecca Goodhart
          - Daniel Goodhart
        - William Goodhart (1933–2017)
        - Charles Goodhart (born 1936)
      - Howard Goodhart
      - Helen Goodhart (1887–1985), married to Frank Altschul (1887–1981), banker
        - Margaret Lang, married to journalist Daniel Lang (1913–1981), 3 children
          - Frances Lang Labaree
          - Helen Lang
          - Cecily Lang Kooyman
        - Edith Altschul Graham (died 2003), married Robert Claverhouse Graham, 3 children
          - Robert C. Graham Jr. married Christine Denny, daughter of Charles R. Denny (1912–2000), 2 children, divorced. Married Julie Moran, 1 Child.
            - Elizabeth Ashley Graham, married Adam Marc Lindemann, son of George Lindemann (1936–2018)
            - Kathryn Graham
            - James Wesley Hawkes Graham
          - Michael C. Graham
          - Kathryn G. Graham
        - Arthur Goodhart Altschul Sr. (1920–2002), investment banker
          - married Stephanie Rosemary Wagner in 1956, she later died in a plane crash, 2 children
            - Stephen Altschul (born 1957), mathematician and researcher; married to Caroline Kershaw James
              - James Altschul
              - William Altschul (born 1998)
            - Charles Altschul
          - married Siri von Reis (1931–2021) (divorced 1972), 3 children
            - Arthur Goodhart Altschul Jr. (born 1964), married 2013 Rula Jebreal (born 1973) divorced 2016
            - Emily Helen Altschul (born 1966), married John Miller (born 1958) in 2002
            - Serena Altschul (born 1970), broadcast journalist and MTV host
    - Arthur Lehman (1873–1936), married to Adele Lewisohn Lehman (1882–1965), daughter of Adolph Lewisohn (1849–1938), mining magnate, 3 children
      - Dorothy Lehman Bernhard (1903–1969), married to investment banker Richard Jaques Bernhard in 1923, 2 children
        - Robert Arthur Bernhard (1928–2019)
        - William Lehman Bernhard (born 1931), married Catherine Cahill, daughter of attorney John T. Cahill (1903–1966) in 1974 and Grace Pickens, a member of the Pickens Sisters
      - Helen Lehman (1905–1989), lawyer, married to Benjamin Buttenwieser (1900–1991), banker at Kuhn, Loeb & Co., son of Joseph L. Buttenwieser (1865–1938)
        - Lawrence B. Buttenwieser, lawyer at Katten Muchin Rosenman, married to Ann Lubin, daughter of Isador Lubin (1896–1978)
          - Jill Ann Buttenwieser Schloss, married to Richard Perry Schloss
          - Carol Buttenwieser Sharp
          - Peter Lubin Buttenwieser (born 1965), married to Susan Helen Upton in 1995
        - Peter L. Buttenwieser (1935–2018), philanthropist, married to Elizabeth Werthan
        - Paul A. Buttenwieser, psychiatrist
      - Frances Lehman Loeb (1906–1996), married to John Langeloth Loeb Sr. (1902–1996) (son of Carl M. Loeb (1875–1955)), 5 children
        - John Langeloth Loeb Jr. (born 1930), businessman
          - married to Nina Sundby from 1960, 1 child
            - Alexandra Loeb Driscoll, married to Joseph Edward Driscoll, 2 children
              - Aidan Edward Driscoll
              - Allegra Frances Driscoll
          - married to Meta Martindell Harrsen, 1 child
            - Nicholas M. Loeb (born 1976)
          - married to Sharon J. Handler in 2011
        - Judith Loeb Chiara married to Richard N. Beaty, married and divorced from Marco Chiara, the son of the Italian novelist Piero Chiara (1913–1986)
        - Arthur Lehman Loeb
        - Deborah Loeb Brice
        - Ann Loeb Bronfman (1932–2011), married to Edgar Bronfman Sr. (1929–2013)
          - Samuel Bronfman (born 1954), married to Melanie Mann.
          - Edgar Bronfman Jr. (born 1955)
            - married to Sherry Brewer from 1979 to 1991, 3 children
              - Benjamin Bronfman (born 1982); one child with Mathangi "Maya" Arulpragasam (born 1975)
                - Ikhyd Edgar Arular Bronfman (2009)
              - Vanessa Bronfman
              - Hannah Bronfman (born 1987), married Brendan Fallis (2017)
            - married Clarisa Alcock San Román in 1993, 4 children
              - Aaron Bronfman
              - Bettina Bronfman
              - Erik Bronfman
              - Clarissa Bronfman
          - Matthew Bronfman (born 1959)
            - married Fiona Woods, divorced 1997, 3 children
              - Gabriela Talia Bronfman
              - Eli Miles Bronfman
              - Jeremy Samuel Bronfman
            - married Lisa Belzberg, daughter of Canadian businessman Samuel Belzberg (1928–2018), 3 children, divorced
              - Sasha Eliana Bronfman
              - Tess Emanuella Bronfman
              - Ezekiel "Zeke" Belzberg Bronfman
            - married Stacey Kaye in 2005, 1 child, divorced in 2016
              - Coby Benjamin Bronfman
            - married Melanie Lavie in 2017, 2 children
              - James Raphael Bronfman
              - Stella Ann Bronfman
          - Holly Bronfman Lev, married to Yoav Lev. She is a convert to Hinduism and has taken the name Bhavani Lev.
          - Adam Bronfman (born 1963), married Cynthia Marie Gage, 4 children
    - Irving Lehman (1876–1945), U.S. lawyer and politician, married to Sissie Straus, daughter of Nathan Straus (1848–1931), no children
    - Herbert H. Lehman (1878–1963), 45th Governor of New York; married Edith Louise Altschul in 1910 (sister of banker Frank Altschul (1887–1981)), 3 children
      - Hilda Jane Lehman de Vadetzky Paul Wise (1921–1974), married three times, Her first marriage to Boris de Vadetzky in 1940 ended in divorce in 1944, no children; her second marriage to Eugene L. Paul in 1945 resulted in divorce, no children; her third marriage also resulted in divorce, 3 children
        - Peter Lehman Wise
          - married Sharon Anne McAuliffe in 1977, divorced, 1 child
            - Catherine Jane Wise, married to David Giffen
          - married Marylou Hanover, 1 child
            - Matthew Lehman Wise
        - Stephanie Wise
        - Deborah Jane Wise, married Peter N. Sheridan in 1971
          - Eli Wise
      - Peter Gerald Lehman (1917–1944); in 1938, he married Peggy Lashanska Rosenbaum, daughter of soprano Hulda Lashanska (1893–1974), 2 children; he was killed while serving during World War II.
        - Penelope "Penny" Lehman Karp (born 1940) married to Stanley Mortimor Karp in 1964
        - Wendy Lehman (1942–2016)
      - John Robert Lehman (1920–1994)
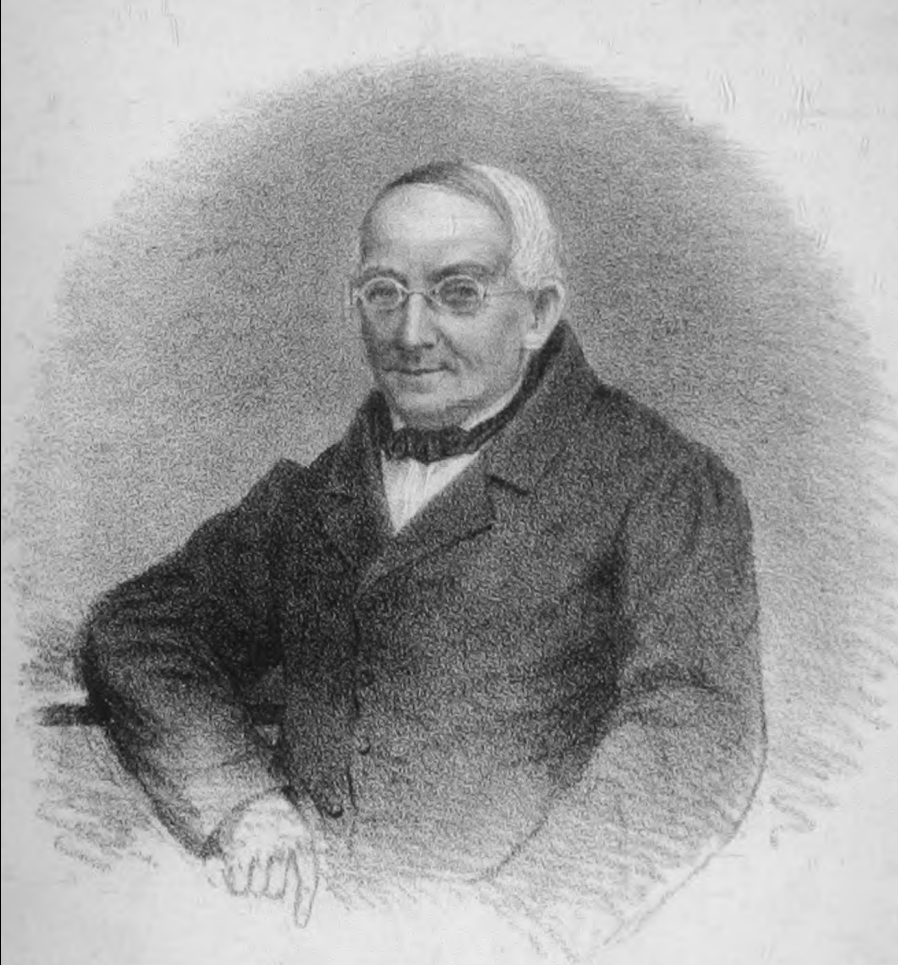
Elias Altschul

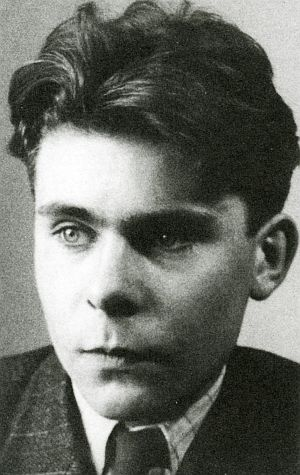
Rudolf Altschul

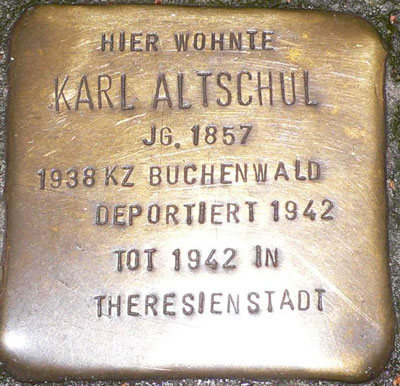
Karl Altschul

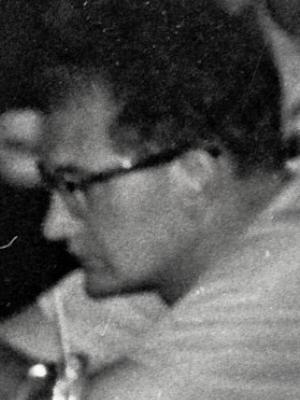
Milos Altschul

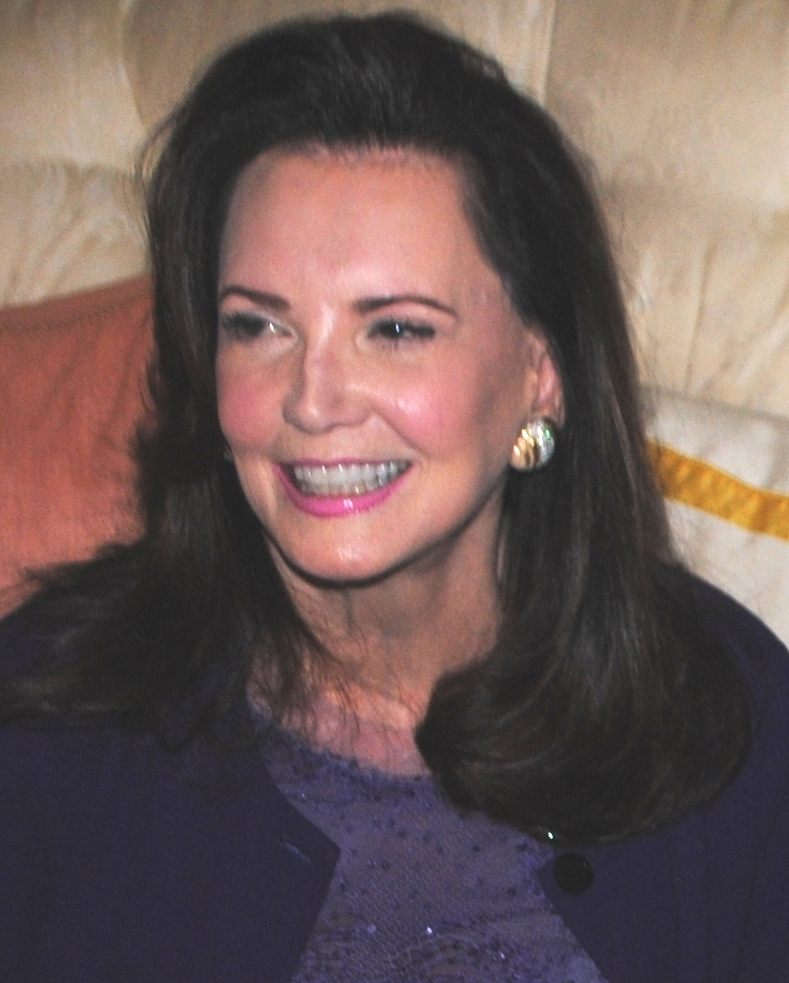
Patricia Altschul

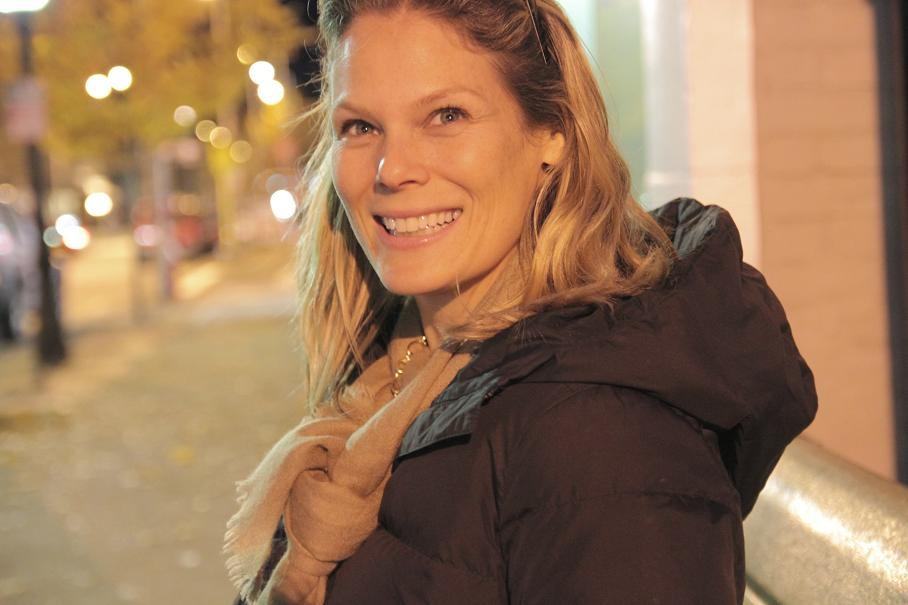
Serena Altschul
