= Marjorie Blankstein =

Canadian activist (born 1929)

Marjorie Blankstein CC OM
- Born: Marjorie Beatrice Rady; 1929 (age 96–97); Winnipeg, Manitoba, Canada
- Education: University of Manitoba (BA, MSW)
- Spouse: Morley Blankstein (m. 1952; died 2015)
- Children: 4
- Relatives: Samuel Bronfman (uncle)
- Family: Bronfman family

Marjorie Beatrice Blankstein CM OM (née Rady; born 1929) is a Canadian fundraiser, community activist and volunteer. Through her mother Rose, she is a member of the wealthy Bronfman family and a niece of Samuel Bronfman.

== Biography ==
Blankstein was born Marjorie Beatrice Rady in Winnipeg, Manitoba. She attended Grosvenor, Robert H. Smith and Kelvin High schools. She graduated from the University of Manitoba with a Bachelor of Arts degree in 1950. She obtained her Master of Social Work degree in 1952. After her graduation, she married architect Morley Blankstein. She has three sons, two daughters and seven grandchildren. Blankstein was married to architect Morley Blankstein from July 1952 until his death in June 2015.

She has been very active in the community, and currently serves as a board member of the Rady Jewish Community Centre and the Mauro Centre for Peace and Justice. She also serves as a member of the Capital Campaign Advisory Council for Friends of the Ralph Connor House Inc. She was the Honorary Co-Chair of the Words and Deeds Leadership Award Dinner honouring the Richardson family in October 2007. She was among five honourees at the first Spirit of Leadership awards luncheon held in Winnipeg on March 14, 2008.

In the past, she has been involved with over 30 different community organizations, ranging from Jewish Child and Family Service, Age and Opportunity Centre Inc., Winnipeg Symphony Orchestra, LEAF to the United Way of Winnipeg. She became a Member of the Order of Canada in 1982. She is also an honorary life member of Jewish Child and Family Service and was the first recipient of the Sol Kanee Distinguished Community Service Medal from the Winnipeg Jewish Community Council. She has been honoured with the Queen's Silver Jubilee and 125th Anniversary of Confederation Commemorative medals and has been recognized as the YM/YWCA Woman of the Year (Community Service category) in 1978, Volunteer of the Year (by the Association of Fundraising Professionals of Manitoba) in 2000 and with a Distinguished Service Award from the University of Manitoba in 2003.

Blankstein has continued to receive recognition throughout the 21st Century, including receiving an honorary degree from the University of Manitoba in 2014 and honors at the Rady JCC Sports Dinner in 2019.
