= Andrea Bronfman =

American philanthropist (1945–2006)

- Born: Andrea Brett Morrison; May 30, 1945; London, United Kingdom
- Died: January 23, 2006 (aged 60); Manhattan, New York, U.S.
- Occupation: philanthropist
- Spouse(s): David Cohen (divorced); Charles Bronfman (until her death)
- Children: with Cohen: --Jeremy Cohen --Philippa Cohen --Anthony Cohen
- Parent(s): Doris Morrison; Hyam Morrison

Andrea Brett Morrison Bronfman (May 30, 1945 – January 23, 2006) was a philanthropist and wife of billionaire Charles Bronfman, who was once co-chairman of Seagram's Co.

== Personal life ==
She was born Andrea Brett Morrison in 1945 to a British Jewish family in London, the daughter of Hyam and Doris Morrison. Her father led the United Joint Israel Appeal, and her mother founded the British Friends of the Museums of Israel.

She moved to Canada as a young bride with her first husband, David Cohen, (the grandson of Lyon Cohen, a prominent businessman, philanthropist, and founder of the Canadian Jewish Congress and the "Jewish Times", the first Canadian Jewish newspaper). (David Cohen was the first cousin of singer Leonard Cohen.) After that marriage ended in divorce, she married Charles Bronfman, who had served as best man at her marriage to Cohen.

The Andrea M. Bronfman Prize for the Arts is given annually in her honour.

== Death ==
She died in 2006 after being hit by a taxi in Central Park. A letter of condolence from the World Jewish Congress, whose president was her brother-in-law, Edgar Bronfman Sr., called Bronfman a pillar of her family and of the Jewish community.

She is survived by her children with David Cohen (died 2010): Jeremy Cohen, and his wife Marci Ann, Philippa "Pippa" Cohen, Anthony "Tony" Cohen and his wife Moira; grandchildren Danielle Maya Cohen, Scott Morrison Cohen, and Talia Cohen, and stepgrandchildren Alexandra Bronfman, Lila Hauptman, and Zack Hauptman.

A memorial ceremony was held Congregation B'nai Jeshurun in Manhattan and she was buried in Jerusalem.

== Philanthropy ==
Andrea Bronfman and her husband were active in numerous charities including:

- Andrea and Charles Bronfman Philanthropies
- Gift of New York, a charity put together after the September 11, 2001 attacks on the United States.

== See also ==
- Bronfman family
