= Saidye Rosner Bronfman =

Canadian philanthropist (1896–1995)

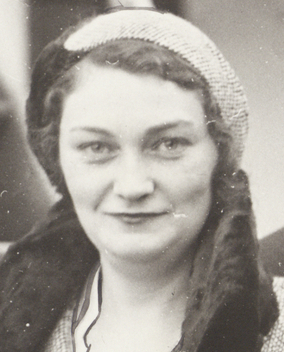
- Born: Saidye Rosner; 9 December 1896; Plum Coulee, Manitoba, Canada
- Died: 6 July 1995 (aged 98); Montreal, Quebec, Canada
- Education: University of Manitoba
- Occupation: Philanthropist
- Known for: Bronfman family
- Spouse: Samuel Bronfman (m. 1922; died 1971)
- Children: 4

Saidye Rosner Bronfman OBE (9 December 1896 – 6 July 1995) was a Canadian-Jewish philanthropist. Her husband, Samuel Bronfman (1891–1971), purchased Joseph E. Seagram and Sons Limited, that became the Seagram Company. The family took a leading role in the Canadian-Jewish community.

== Early life ==
Bronfman was born in Plum Coulee, Manitoba to well-to-do Jewish parents. Her father, Samuel Rosner (1871–1952), was a businessman from Bessarabia, who emigrated to England before settling in Canada. He also served a two-year term as mayor of Plum Coulee. Her mother, Priscilla Berger Rosner (1876–1951), was a homemaker who was also an immigrant to Canada from Odesa, Ukraine, Russian Empire. She studied at Havergal Ladies' College in Winnipeg and the University of Manitoba. Saidye married Samuel Bronfman (1891–1971) in 1922 and two years later they moved to Montreal, Canada.

== Career and philanthropy ==
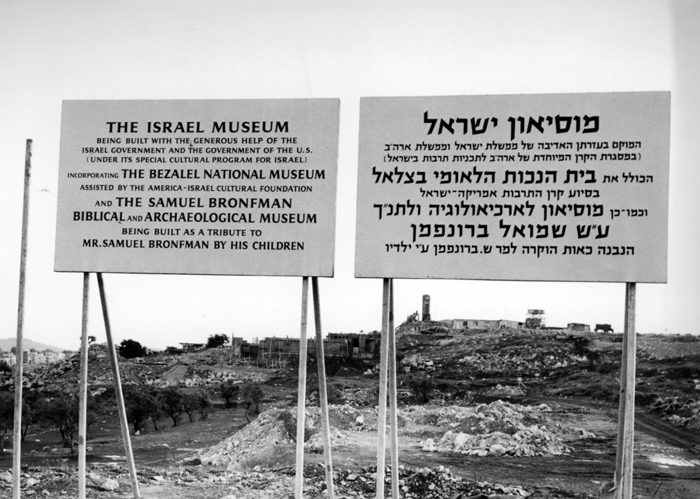
The Bronfman Archaeology Wing of the Israel Museum in Jerusalem, Israel, is named for Bronfman and her husband

Prior to her marriage, Bronfman served as president of the Girls' Auxiliary of the Winnipeg Jewish Orphanage Society and later headed the Orphans' Home. From 1929, she served as president of the Young Women's Hebrew Association in Montreal for six years. She was also founder and president of the Combined Jewish Appeal Women’s Division from 1931 to 1933, and in 1934 was one of the founders of Canadian Youth Aliyah. In 1943, she was given the title of Officer of the Order of the British Empire by King George VI of England for her establishment of the Jewish branch of the Canadian Red Cross Society.

In 1952, her husband Sam established The Samuel and Saidye Bronfman Family Foundation, one of Canada’s major private granting foundations. The Saidye Bronfman Award was established in 1977 by the foundation to honour her 80th birthday. This annual award for excellence in the fine crafts is now administered by the Canada Council for the Arts. The Saidye Bronfman Centre for the Arts (now known as the Segal Centre) was named for her and donated to the community by her children in 1968. In 1974, then-Israeli Prime Minister Golda Meir presented Bronfman with the Prime Minister’s Medal for her service in the cause of Israel’s development.

She was also honorary president of Montreal’s Jewish federation, Federation CJA and the Samuel and Saidye Bronfman Family Foundation. She also worked on behalf of World ORT, the National Council of Jewish Women, Hadassah-WIZO of Canada, Canada-Israel Cultural Foundation and Save the Children.

== Personal life ==
She had four children with her husband: Aileen Mindel "Minda" Bronfman de Gunzburg (1925–1985), wife of French-born Hessian Baron Alain de Gunzburg; Phyllis Barbara Lambert (born 1927); Edgar Miles Bronfman (1929–2013); and Charles Rosner Bronfman (born 1931).

She and her husband mostly lived in Montreal where their primary residence was Sumner-Bronfman House at 15 Belvedere Road in Westmount, which they purchased in 1928. The couple spent time in The US in Manhattan and at their estate in Tarrytown, New York. Saidye Bronfman died in Montreal at age 98. Today, the Westmount home is occupied by her grandson, Stephen Bronfman and his family.

She has 11 grandchildren, including: Edgar Bronfman Jr., Matthew Bronfman, Adam Bronfman, Stephen Bronfman, Clare Bronfman and Sara Bronfman.

=== Death and legacy ===
She died in 1995 at the age of 98 and her funeral ceremony was attended by over 2, 000 people at the Saidye Bronfman Centre for the Arts, including Canadian Prime Minister, Jean Chretien and David Berger, Canadian Ambassador to Israel. Both Israeli Prime Minister Yitzhak Rabin and Foreign Minister Shimon Peres sent personal condolence notes to the family.

Her grandson Adam established the Saidye Rosner Bronfman Rabbinic Chair at Temple Har Shalom, a burgeoning Reform community in Park City, Utah.
