= Bronfman family =

Canadian business family

The Bronfman family is a Canadian family, known for its extensive business holdings. It owes its initial fame to Samuel Bronfman (1889–1971), the most influential Canadian Jew of the mid-20th century, who made a fortune in the alcoholic distilled beverage business during American prohibition, including the sale of liquor through organized crime, through founding the Seagram Company, and who later became president of the Canadian Jewish Congress (1939–62).

The family is of Russian-Jewish ancestry; the patriarch, Yechiel (Ekiel) Bronfman, was originally a tobacco farmer from Bessarabia. According to The New York Times staff reporter Nathaniel Popper, the Bronfman family is "perhaps the single largest force in the Jewish charitable world".

== Family tree ==
- Ekiel Bronfman (1852–1919) ⚭ Mindel Elman (1861–1918)
  - Abe Bronfman (1882–1968) ⚭ Sophie Rasminsky (1886–1967)
    - Nathan Bronfman (later Brown)
      - Gordon Brown ⚭ Barbara Brown
    - Zella Bronfman (1910–1988) ⚭ Jack E. Butler
    - Rona Lee Bronfman (1912–1993) ⚭ Alfred E. Brunswick (1901–1974)
    - Mildred Bronfman (1913–2011) ⚭ Bernard Julian Lande (1909–1992)
      - Neil Bronfman Lande (1938–2016) ⚭ Myrna Bregman
      - Eric Lande
      - Ruth Lande
      - Margot Lande
    - Beatrice Bronfman (1915–2008) ⚭ William M. Doniger (1908–1972)
    - Ruth Bronfman (1924–2014) ⚭ Stanley Berns (1917–2005)
  - Harry Bronfman (1886–1963) ⚭ Ann Gallaman (1884–1970)
    - Allan Bronfman Jr. (1906–1944) ⚭ Freda Besner (1906-1995)
      - Marion Ruth Bronfman (1932–2003) ⚭ Chris Kirkham
      - Mitchell Bronfman (1934–2014)
      - Beverly Bronfman (1939–2013)
    - Samson Bronfman (1909–1910)
    - Gerald Bronfman (1911–1986) ⚭ Marjorie Meta Schechter (1917–2012)
      - Joanie Bronfman ⚭ Neil McMillan
      - Corrine Marcia Bronfman (1947–2022)
      - Judy Bronfman ⚭ Isaac Thau
      - Jeffrey Bronfman ⚭ Stacey
    - Rona Retta Bronfman (1916–2001) ⚭ Irving Levitt (1911–1998)
      - Marilyn Levitt ⚭ Al Yunis
      - Allan Levitt ⚭ Judi Fish
  - Laura Bronfman (1888–1976) ⚭ Barnett Aaron (1888–1981)
    - Arnold Aaron (1912–2002) ⚭ Felicia Werner (1925–2018)
    - Ellswood Mellor Aaron (1920–1941)
    - Miriam Aaron ⚭ Sam Roland (1923–1970)
  - Samuel Bronfman (1889–1971) ⚭ Saidye Rosner (1896–1995)
    - Aileen Mindel Bronfman (1925–1985) ⚭ Alain François Jacques de Gunzburg (1925–2004)
    - Phyllis Barbara Bronfman (b. 1927) ⚭ Jean Lambert
    - Edgar Miles Bronfman Sr. (1929–2013), ⚭ 1953–1973 Ann Margaret Loeb (1932-2011); ⚭ 1973–1974 Carolyn Townshend; ⚭ Rita Eileen Webb; ⚭ 1994 to Jan Aronson (b. 1949)
      - Samuel Bronfman II (b. 1953) ⚭ Melanie Mann
      - Edgar Miles Bronfman Jr. (b. 1955), ⚭ 1979–1991 to Sherry Brewer; ⚭ 1993 to Clarisa Alcock San Román
        - Benjamin Zachary Bronfman (b. 1982), engaged 2009–2012 to and had a son with M.I.A.
        - Hannah Marcina Bronfman (b. 1987) ⚭ Brendan Fallis
      - Matthew Bronfman (b. 1959), ⚭ 1982-1997 Fiona Woods; ⚭ 1997-2002 Lisa Belzberg; ⚭ 2005-2016 to Stacey Kaye; ⚭ 2016 Melanie Lavie
      - Holly Bronfman ⚭ Yoav Lev
      - Adam Rodgers Bronfman (b. 1963)
      - Sara Rosner Bronfman (b. 1976) ⚭ Basit Igtet (b. 1970)
      - Clare Bronfman (b. 1979)
    - Charles Rosner Bronfman (b. 1931), ⚭ 1961–1982 Barbara Baerwald (1938–2021); ⚭ 1982–2006 Andrea "Andy" Brett Morrison Cohen (1945–2006); ⚭ 2008–2011 Bonita Roche; ⚭ 2012 Rita Mayo
      - Stephen Rosner Bronfman (b. 1964) ⚭ Claudine Blondin
      - Ellen Jane Bronfman (b. 1969) ⚭ Andrew Hauptman
  - Bessie Bronfman (1893–1981) ⚭ Harry Louis Druxerman (1887–1948); ⚭ Harry Soforenko (1898-1964)
    - Jacqueline Blanche Druxerman (1917–2008) ⚭ Hyman Norman Bernstein (1913–1972)
    - Alven Druxerman (1918–2008) ⚭ Ruth Devries (1923–2014)
  - Jean Bronfman (1894–1983) ⚭ Paul Matoff (1887–1922); ⚭ Peter Groper (1898–1957)
    - Muriel Beatrice Matoff (1915–1984)
    - Millicent Camille Matoff (1921–2004) ⚭ John Starr (1917–2006)
    - Irving Maurice Groper (1926–2015)
    - Shayla Groper (1930–2002) ⚭ Edwin Rosenberg (1922–1971)
      - Michael Foster Rosenberg (1954–2014)
      - Robyn Ellen Pulte (1957-)
      - Peri Beth Lamb (1958-) ⚭ Marty Lamb (1957-)
        - Alyssa Mucciarone (1991-)
        - Simma Lamb (1993-)
    - Pat Earle Groper (1932–2022) ⚭ Eleanor Shanker
    - Zelda Groper (1933–2024) ⚭ Phillip Smith
  - Allan Bronfman (1895–1980) ⚭ Lucy Bilsky (1897–1983)
    - Mildred Mona Bronfman (1923–1950) ⚭ Edward Sheckman (1917–2007)
      - Zoe Sheckman
    - Edward Maurice Bronfman (1927–2005) ⚭ Beverly Chertkow (1934–2014); ⚭ Marsha
      - Paul Bronfman (1957–2025)
      - David Bronfman
      - Brian Bronfman
    - Peter Frederick Bronfman (1929–1996) ⚭ Diane Sorrel Feldman (1931–2002)
      - Linda Bronfman
      - Brenda Bronfman
      - Bruce Bronfman
    - Arthur Julian Bronfman (1936–1936)
  - Rose Bronfman (1898–1988) ⚭ Avraham Maxwell Rady (1893–1964)
    - Mindel Rady (1924–2001) ⚭ Thomas Olenick (1921–2007)
      - Gail Olenick ⚭ Arne Wagner
      - Debby Olenick ⚭ Brian Hirsch
      - Roberta Olenick
    - Marjorie Rady (b. 1929) ⚭ Morley Blankstein (1924–2015)
      - Carol Blankstein ⚭ Barry McArton
      - Daniel Blankstein ⚭ Sara Israels
      - Linda Blankstein ⚭ Mesut Senoglu
      - Leo Blankstein ⚭ Mary
      - Max Blankstein

== Early history ==
The name Bronfman (Yiddish בראָנפמאַן bronfman) comes from Yiddish בראָנפֿן bronfn, 'liquor, whisky/whiskey, spirits', which is cognate with German Branntwein (in Germany the term refers to any distilled spirits), Dutch brandewijn (which became English brandywine, i.e., 'brandy'), and Afrikaans brandewyn, plus Yiddish מאַן man, 'man'; it coincidently translates to 'spirits-man', referring to one who makes or sells whiskey. The Bronfman family in Canada began with tobacco farmer Yechiel Bronfman (aka Ekiel Bronfman; 16 November 1855 - 24 December 1919) and his wife, Mindel (née Elman; 25 May 1863 - 11 Nov 1918), who emigrated from Moldova to Canada with their children in 1889, escaping the anti-Semitic pogroms of Imperial Russia.

In addition to Samuel Bronfman, Yechiel and Mindel's children at the time of emigration included Abe (15 March 1882, Russia - 16 March 1968, Safety Harbor, Florida), Harry (15 March 1886, Russia - 12 November 1963, Montreal, QC), and Laura Bronfman (1 Jan 1887, Russia - 1976); in total they had 8 children.

The family settled at a homestead near Wapella, Saskatchewan, but soon moved to Brandon, Manitoba. In 1903, the family borrowed money to buy a hotel (the Anglo-American Hotel) in Emerson, Manitoba, which turned out to be profitable due to railway construction. In 1906, the family moved to Winnipeg. With the advent of Prohibition in Canada, Samuel and his brothers turned their energy toward selling mail-order liquor. Following the government's crack-down on the business, the brothers took another route: As it was still legal to sell alcohol as medicine, the brothers rebranded their liquor using names like "Liver & Kidney Cure", "Dandy Bracer-Liver", and "Rock-a-bye Cough-Cure". Samuel took control of the business after prohibition came to an end in the United States, and was known as "Mr. Sam".

== Business and philanthropy ==
According to The New York Times staff reporter Nathaniel Popper, the Bronfman family is "perhaps the single largest force in the Jewish charitable world". The family owes its initial fame to Samuel Bronfman (1889–1971), who made a fortune in the alcoholic distilled beverage business during American prohibition through founding the Seagram Company, and who later became president of the Canadian Jewish Congress (1939–62).

Saidye Bronfman, Samuel's wife, was president of the Young Women’s Hebrew Association (YWHA) beginning in 1929, and later founded the women’s division of the Combined Jewish Appeal. In 1952, the couple formed The Samuel and Saidye Bronfman Family Foundation to make grants primarily in support of education, the arts, heritage preservation, and Jewish community initiatives. Their daughter, Phyllis Lambert, founded the Canadian Centre for Architecture.

For years, Seagram was run by Samuel and Saidye's sons, Edgar and Charles Bronfman; and their grandson Edgar Bronfman Jr. oversaw the sale of company to Vivendi. Charles was also co-founder of the Historica Foundation of Canada and Heritage Minutes, as well as chairman and principal owner of the Montreal Expos.

The youngest daughter of Edgar Sr., Clare Bronfman, was a benefactor of Keith Raniere and has been sentenced to almost seven years for her role in the NXIVM case. Samuel's nephews Edward and Peter Bronfman (sons of Allan Bronfman), founded Edper Investments (now Brookfield Asset Management).

In 1994, the Bronfman family in collaboration with McGill University in Montreal, Quebec, supported the establishment of the McGill Institute for the Study of Canada (MISC), a nonpartisan Canadian research institute.

In 1922, Samuel's younger sister, Rose Bronfman (3 February 1898, Manitoba - 31 May 1988), was a substitute teacher and community activist. She married physician Maxwell Rady (born as Avraham Radishkevich, 24 November 1899 - 3 March 1964) - himself a Russian Jewish immigrant, who moved to Manitoba in 1893 - and the couple remained notable philanthropists in Winnipeg. The University of Manitoba named its health sciences faculty and its College of Medicine in Rady's honor. The Rady Children’s Hospital in San Diego, and its Rady Children's Institute for Genomic Medicine, are named after the Rady family in honor of its largest donor, Ernest S. Rady (b. 1937), Rose and Max's son.

Jeremy and Eli Bronfman founded Lincoln Avenue Capital, a real estate investor and developer in affordable housing.

== Works or publications ==
=== Works about the Bronfman Family ===
- Faith, Nicholas. 2006. The Bronfmans: The Rise and Fall of the House of Seagram. New York: St. Martin's Press. ISBN 978-0-312-33219-8
- Gittins, Susan. 1995. Behind Closed Doors: The Rise and Fall of Canada's Edper Bronfman and Reichmann Empires. Scarborough, ON: Prentice Hall Canada. ISBN 978-0-131-82189-7
- MacLeod, Roderick, and Eric John Abrahamson. 2010. Spirited Commitment The Samuel and Saidye Bronfman Family Foundation, 1952-2007. Montréal: McGill-Queen's University Press, for the Samuel and Saidye Bronfman Foundation. ISBN 978-0-773-58333-7
- Marrus, Michael R. 1991. Samuel Bronfman: The Life and Times of Seagram's Mr. Sam. Hanover: University Press of New England, for Brandeis University Press. ISBN 978-0-585-26546-9
- Newman, Peter Charles. 1978. Bronfman Dynasty: The Rothschilds of the New World. Toronto: McClelland and Stewart. ISBN 978-0-771-06758-7
  - Republished: 1979. King of the castle: the making of a dynasty : Seagram's and the Bronfman empire. New York: Atheneum.
- Bronfman Family Dynasty (video), on Biography
- Whisky man inside the dynasty of Samuel Bronfman (video). Kelowna, BC: FilmWest Associates, distributor. 1996.
  - Video abstract: "Documents the rise to success of the Bronfman Family, who came to Canada as poor immigrants and became rich and powerful through selling (through Prohibition) and distilling whisky (Seagram Company). Family members recall the tough and determined character of Samuel who strove for social acceptance and respectability while alienating many of his family."

The novel Solomon Gursky Was Here, by Mordecai Richler, has been described as a thinly veiled account of the Bronfman family.

=== Works by the Bronfman family ===
- Bronfman, Charles, and Howard Green. 2016. Distilled: A Memoir of Family, Seagram, Baseball and Philanthropy.
- Bronfman, Charles, and Jeffrey Solomon. 2010. The Art of Giving: Where the Soul Meets a Business Plan. San Francisco, CA: Jossey-Bass. ISBN 978-0-4705-0146-7
- —— 2012. The Art of Doing Good: Where Passion Meets Action. San Francisco, CA: Jossey-Bass. ISBN 978-1-1182-8574-9
- Bronfman, Edgar M. 1996. The Making of a Jew. New York: Putnam. ISBN 978-0-399-14220-8
- —— 1998. Good Spirits: The Making of a Businessman. New York: Putnam. ISBN 978-0-399-14374-8
- Bronfman, Edgar M., and Beth Zasloff. 2008. Hope, Not Fear: A Path to Jewish Renaissance. New York: St. Martin's Press. ISBN 978-0-3123-7792-2
- Bronfman, Edgar M., and Catherine Whitney. 2002. The Third Act: Reinventing Yourself After Retirement. New York: G. P. Putnam. ISBN 978-0-399-14869-9
- Bronfman, Edgar M., and Jan Aronson. 2012. The Bronfman Haggadah. New York: Rizzoli International Publications. ISBN 978-0-8478-3968-1. OCLC 795175261.
- Bronfman, Saidye. 1982. My Sam: A Memoir. Erin, ON: Porcupine's Quill. [Privately printed; one thousand copies have been printed.]
- Lambert, Phyllis, and Barry Bergdoll. 2013. Building Seagram. New Haven, CT; London, UK : Yale University Press. ISBN 978-0-300-16767-2

== See also ==
- Bronfman kidnapping
- Seagram Building
- Seagram House (now Martlet House)
- Cemp Investments
- Edper Investments
- The Samuel and Saidye Bronfman Family Foundation
- Lehman family
