= Stephen Cooper (businessman) =

American businessman

- Education: BA, Occidental College; MBA, Wharton School of Business
- Occupation: Businessman
- Known for: Former CEO of the Warner Music Group

Stephen F. Cooper (born 1948) is a businessman and the former CEO of the Warner Music Group.

== Education ==
Cooper has a BA from Occidental College and an MBA from the Wharton School of Business.

== Career ==
Cooper has held several important positions with various companies throughout his career. He was in charge of several venture businesses. He previously served as vice-chairman of Metro-Goldwyn-Mayer and was also CEO of Hawaiian Telcom.

=== Cooper Investment Partners ===
Cooper has also been the chairman and a managing director at private equity firm Cooper Investment Partners since its founding in 2010.

=== Warner Music Group ===
Cooper became CEO of Warner Music Group (WMG) in August 2011, replacing Edgar Bronfman Jr., who then became chairman of the company upon Cooper's appointment. During his time leading the company, it has grown substantially. In 2021, Warner Music Group reporters its highest quarterly revenue since the company was spun out of Time Warner in 2004.

He was succeeded by Robert Kyncl as CEO of WMG in early 2023.

== Personal life ==
Cooper is an Indiana native and father to two children. In 2017, Cooper's total salary was reported to be $15,206,818.

Business positions
| Preceded by Edgar Bronfman Jr. | Chief Executive Officer of Warner Music Group; August 19, 2011-present | Succeeded by incumbent |
