= Hannah Bronfman =

American DJ, influencer, and entrepreneur

- Born: Hannah Marcina Bronfman; October 26, 1987 (age 38); New York City, U.S.
- Education: Bard College
- Occupation: Entrepreneur
- Spouse: Brendan Fallis (m. 2017)
- Children: 2
- Father: Edgar Bronfman Jr.
- Family: Bronfman; Lehman
- Website: hbronfman.com

Hannah Marcina Bronfman (born October 26, 1987) is an American heiress, and social media influencer.

== Early life and education ==
Bronfman is the daughter of African American actress Sherri Brewer and Edgar Bronfman Jr., heir to the Bronfman family, one of the wealthiest and most influential Jewish families in Canada. She is the granddaughter of Edgar Miles Bronfman – who owned Distillers Corporation-Seagrams Ltd. – the world’s largest producer and distributor of distilled spirits. She grew up in the Upper West Side.

Through her paternal grandmother, Ann Loeb Bronfman, she is a member of the prominent Lehman family of Jewish Americans who founded the investment bank Lehman Brothers.

She graduated from Bard College in December 2010 with a degree in sculpture.

== Career ==
When she was 20, Bronfman invested in the restaurant Hotel Griffou. She and her older brother Benjamin Bronfman were co-founders of Green Owl, an ecologically oriented multimedia company, which she managed.

In 2012, Bronfman co-founded Beautified, a defunct mobile app for finding last-minute beauty services. The app originally covered only New York City, but expanded to Los Angeles and San Francisco in August 2014. Beautified's expansion coincided with an announcement that it had raised $1.2 million in seed funding. Bronfman was ousted from the company in 2014; as of April 2018, the app was defunct.

She was featured in the fashion documentary This is My Reality in 2013, and was a featured model at DKNY's Fall 2014 Fashion Show and walked the runway. It was her first appearance on a runway.

She published a health and wellness book titled Do What Feels Good and ran an associated website for three years.

Bronfman is a former New York City-based event DJ.

== Personal life ==
On August 17, 2015, Bronfman became engaged to Brendan Fallis. They were married in Marrakesh, Morocco, on May 20, 2017, and have homes in Amagansett, New York, and Manhattan. In a 2026 interview, Bronfman said that Fallis challenged her to reconsider her reliance on her trust fund and that she subsequently pursued financial independence through her own work. They have two children, a son born in 2020 and a daughter born in 2023.

== Filmography ==
- Grand Street (2014) – Mia
- American Milkshake (2013) – Cheerleader
