= Samuel and Saidye Bronfman Family Foundation =

Canadian charitable foundation

The Samuel and Saidye Bronfman Family Foundation is a private Canadian foundation providing grants to support the community sector. The foundation was established in 1952 as a means by which members of the Bronfman family could combine their philanthropic endeavours.

== Past and present initiatives ==
=== Cultural Management Development ===
Supports initiatives that improve the governance and management of non-profit organisations committed to art and heritage.

=== Urban Issues ===
Provides grants to community-oriented initiatives that improve the living conditions for residents in urban areas of Canada. Over the years, the Foundation funded several Canadian urban development projects through its Urban Issues Program including transportation planning in Ottawa, street theatre in Montreal, and community development certificate programs in Halifax. One of the most innovative of the projects was Dummies Theatre, which staged free theatrical performances in vacant urban storefronts to draw attention to the historical significance and social potential of these spaces.

=== Public health ===
From 1961 to 1970, the foundation funded the American Public Health Association's Bronfman Prize for Public Health Achievement and Annual Bronfman Lecture to support public health practitioners that were neglected by existing awards focused on biomedical discoveries. The first awardees were World Health Organization Director-General Marcolino Gomes Candau, National Tuberculosis Association Director James E. Perkins, and National Heart Institute Director James Watt. The first Bronfman lecture was delivered by John C. Bugher, director of the University of Puerto Rico, Río Piedras' Nuclear Center, on his work supporting the US Atomic Energy Commission's biomedical research.

=== Futures ===
Supports research to identify new ways and opportunities for philanthropy.

=== Special initiatives ===
Provides small grants for new or established organizations wishing to launch a new project that was not part of their main activities.

In addition to the above, the foundation provides funding to the Segal Centre for Performing Arts. In 2007, the Saidye Bronfman Award was placed under the banner of the Governor General's Awards as a result of a CAD1.5 million endowment made to the Canada Council by the Samuel and Saidye Bronfman Family Foundation. It is the only prize reserved for artists and artisans working in the fine crafts.

== See also ==
- Samuel Bronfman
- Saidye Rosner Bronfman
- Phyllis Lambert

== Bibliography ==
- MacLeod, Roderick & Abrahamson, Eric John (2010) Spirited Commitment: The Samuel and Saidye Bronfman Family Foundation, McGill-Queen's University Press, ISBN 9780773537101
