= Insureon =

American marketplace for small business insurance

- Industry: Small Business Insurance
- Founded: 2011; 15 years ago
- Headquarters: Chicago
- Area served: United States
- Key people: Jeff Kroeger (President); Dan Kazan (CEO)
- Products: E&O Insurance, Cyber insurance, Business Owners Insurance, Workers’ Compensation Insurance, General Liability Insurance
- Number of employees: 101–200
- Parent: HUB International Limited

Insureon is an independent marketplace for online delivery of small business insurance. Headquartered in Chicago, Insureon is the largest digital agency for small and medium-sized businesses, offering policies from the nation’s top carriers, including Acuity, Chubb, The Hartford, Hiscox, Liberty Mutual, and Travelers.

Insureon’s digital platform allows small-business owners to compare insurance quotes and buy coverage online. The company is licensed in 50 states, and specializes in numerous industries, from IT professionals to restaurants, with more than 1 million policies written. Employees operate in a “virtual first” environment, working remotely from locations across the United States.

Insureon is a division of Specialty Program Group and Hub International Ltd., ranked 5th among the world's largest insurance brokers with more than 15,000 employees in over 530 offices across North America, offering risk management, insurance, employee benefits, retirement, and wealth management products and services.

== History ==
Insureon’s journey began in 1997, when the company TechInsurance Group was founded as a way to give small technology firms a way to buy insurance online. The company launched Insureon in 2011 as an Insurtech distributor and a fully online brokerage, offering small business insurance in more than 900 industries through its website.

In 2014, Insureon acquired Insurance Noodle, a wholesale insurance broker owned by Willis Group Holdings.

In March 2022, Insureon announced a two-way acquisition with the insurance brokerage Hub International and Bold Penguin, an integrated digital solution platform. As part of the deal, Chicago-based Hub acquired Insureon’s digital agency and brand. Bold Penguin, based in Columbus, Ohio, purchased Insureon’s technology platform. The transaction included Hub licensing Insureon’s technology platform from Bold Penguin. In April of 2025, Hub launched "HUB Private Client Small Business Solutions" which is powered by Insureon.

Insureon’s parent company, Hub International, was No. 2 on the Insurance Journal’s list of Top 100 Independent Property/Casualty Agencies in 2022. Insureon also received several accolades in 2021 and President Jeff Kroeger has made it to Insurance Business America’s Hot 100 list. The company also received Insurance Business America’s 5-Star Insurance Technology Provider Award. Other recent award wins for Insureon include being named a Winner of the Chicagoland Top Workplaces in 2024, as well as named to the 2024 list of Best Places to Work in Insurance by Business Insurance, and as one of the Best Insurance Companies to Work for in the US by Insurance Business Magazine in 2025. In 2026, Insureon was named a USA TODAY Top Workplace.
