= Bronfman kidnapping =

1975 crime in New York, United States

- Location: Purchase, New York, United States
- Date: August 8, 1975; After 11:30 PM
- Attack type: Kidnapping
- Weapons: Gun, handcuffs
- Victim: Samuel Bronfman II
- Perpetrators: Mel Patrick Lynch, Dominic Byrne
- Motive: Extort money ($4.6 million ransom demand)
- Inquiry: FBI
- Charges: Kidnapping, Extortion
- Verdict: Guilty of extortion

In 1975, Samuel Bronfman II (born October 23, 1953), the 21-year-old heir to the Bronfman family trust then worth $750 million ($3.78 billion in 2021), was kidnapped after a gathering in Yorktown Heights, New York, and held for ransom. His kidnappers were caught and the ransom recovered, but the defendants' attorneys mounted a defense that argued Bronfman had been a co-conspirator, and the abductors were only convicted of extortion, not kidnapping. The defense attorney confessed in 2020 that he had been aware the defense was a lie and that Bronfman had been an innocent victim.

== Kidnapping ==
On August 8, 1975, Bronfman had dinner at his father's home in Yorktown Heights in Westchester County, New York. He left alone in his car around 11:30 pm. At 1:45 am on August 9, he called the Yorktown Heights house to say that he had been kidnapped.

A ransom note claimed Bronfman was being buried alive with a ten-day supply of oxygen and threatened that if ransom were not paid, the abductors would kill Bronfman's father, Edgar Bronfman Sr., with cyanide bullets. It demanded a ransom of $4.6 million, at the time the highest ever demanded in a U.S. kidnapping. Portions of the ransom note were identical to one that had been used in the 1968 kidnapping of Barbara Jane Mackle. The demanded amount in the specified form (over half in $10 bills) would have weighed close to 1,000 pounds (450 kg).

The case played out in public, with reporters, photographers and curiosity-seekers camped out at the gates to the 180-acre (70 ha) estate and helicopters circling in a carnival atmosphere. Further communications from the kidnappers demanded that news reports stop.

Bronfman Sr. spent several days going from telephone booth to telephone booth in and around John F. Kennedy Airport following instructions from the abductors.

On August 16, Bronfman Sr. met one of the abductors in Woodside, Queens, with a $2.3 million ransom. FBI agents surveilled the handoff but did not make an arrest; they did get the license number of the car, which turned out to be registered to Mel Patrick Lynch, an Irish immigrant from Banagher who worked as a firefighter.

On August 17, police and FBI raided Lynch's Flatbush, Brooklyn, apartment and found Bronfman there, bound, gagged, and blindfolded. Lynch's co-conspirator was a fellow Irish immigrant from Taughnarra, Dominic Byrne, who lived nearby. Lynch and Byrne were arrested and charged with kidnapping and extortion. They provided the location of the ransom, which was found in two garbage bags in the apartment of a friend of Byrne's who at the time was in the hospital and was not suspected to be involved.

Lynch and Byrne had planned the kidnapping for years, making dozens of trips to Bronfman's mother's house, where Bronfman lived, in Purchase. On the night of the kidnapping, Lynch was there when Bronfman arrived home from dinner at his father's house, and abducted him at gunpoint, handcuffing him.

== Defense ==
Lynch and Byrne told multiple versions of their story. The first version was that Byrne, who ran a limousine service, had been hired to take two unknown men to Westchester county, that Lynch had gone along for the ride, and the two had been forced at gunpoint to pick up Bronfman and another man, turning Lynch and Byrne into unwilling kidnappers.

Lynch's defense attorney, William K. Madden, mounted a defense that Bronfman was the mastermind of the kidnapping. The purported motivation was that Bronfman and Lynch were lovers and that Bronfman wanted to extort money from his wealthy family to help Lynch support a united Ireland. Lynch told investigators he had only agreed to go along with the kidnapping scheme because Bronfman had threatened to tell the fire department that Lynch was gay, which would have threatened his job. Lynch testified in his own defense for four days and was described as "mesmerizing".

Byrne's defense attorney, Peter DeBlasio, had planned to argue that Byrne had been pulled into the scheme by Lynch, but after Lynch testified, decided to echo Madden's defense, even though he knew Lynch had been lying. In his 2020 memoir, DeBlasio wrote:

I can look back now after a 50-year, 600-trial career and say that among the thousands of witnesses I observed, nobody approached the magnificence of Mel Patrick Lynch. He was the Arturo Toscanini and Enrico Caruso of witnesses. He turned a horror story into a tragedy of operatic dimension. The jurors were mesmerized. If they could have, they would have exploded in applause and cried for an encore.

The prosecutor in the case, Geoffrey Orlando, agreed. Speaking in 2020, he said, "He was a great liar, absolutely positively, and a sympathetic character." In contrast, Bronfman did not make a favorable impression on the jury.

District Attorney Carl A. Vergari called the defense “absurd and ridiculous.” The FBI said they had found no evidence that Bronfman had been involved. Representatives of the family said that Bronfman had been at college in Williamstown, Massachusetts, for the period during which he had supposedly been meeting with his purported co-conspirators to plan the abduction.

In 1976, both Lynch and Byrne were convicted only of extortion. Two jurors later told Time that they believed Bronfman had been the mastermind in the kidnapping. In a post-trial interview, Bronfman told reporters, "It’s a pretty sad system when a guy gets kidnapped, the kidnappers are caught red-handed and they get off. The best thing you can do is laugh about it and put it behind you and go on."

=== 2020 admission ===
Shortly before his death, DeBlasio self-published a 2020 memoir, Let Justice Be Done, confessing that during the trial he had been aware the defense was a lie and that Bronfman had been an innocent victim. The memoir, which was self-published, did not receive much attention until an obituary writer for the New York Times followed up on a tip, read the book, did further research, and wrote a feature piece for the Times's Metro section. Both Byrne and Lynch had died by the time the book was published. DeBlasio wrote that he wanted to set the record straight that Bronfman and Lynch were not lovers and that Bronfman had not been involved in planning the kidnapping.

Because Byrne never testified, legal experts said DeBlasio's defense was not an ethical breach, but the memoir did represent one.

DeBlasio's daughter notified Bronfman about her father's memoir, and Bronfman emailed the New York Times to say he was glad DeBlasio acknowledged Lynch's lies.

== Samuel Bronfman II ==
Samuel Bronfman II (born October 23, 1953) is the son of Edgar Bronfman Sr. and his first wife, Anne Loeb Bronfman. He graduated from Williams College in 1975. At Williams he played tennis and basketball and was the sports editor for the Williams Record; at the time of the kidnapping he had accepted a position working in sales at Sports Illustrated. At the time of the kidnapping he was heir to a family trust then worth $750 million. The fallout from the kidnapping and the accusations he'd been involved "poisoned the atmosphere forever" for him, according to Orlando.

Bronfman married Melanie Mann in 1976; she died in 1991 of breast cancer. The couple had a son, Max, and a daughter, Dana. He later married Kelly Johnston.

== See also ==
- Bronfman family
- Seagrams
