= Jan Aronson =

American artist (born 1949)

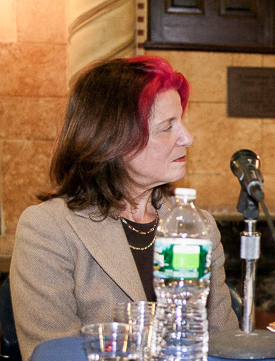
- Aronson in 2013
- Born: Jan Aronson; 1949 (age 76–77); New Orleans, Louisiana, U.S.
- Occupation: Artist
- Spouse: Edgar Bronfman Sr. (m. 1994; died 2013)

Jan Aronson (born 1949) is an American artist.

== Life ==
Aronson was born to a Jewish family in New Orleans. In her early years Aronson worked as an instructor of art for the New Orleans Museum of Art, Dillard University, Southern Vermont Arts Center, Ethan Allen Community College, Johnson State College and Pratt Manhattan Center. Aronson has been a full-time artist since 1986.

Her work is in the public, private and corporate collections of New Orleans Museum of Art - Permanent Collection, Eiteljorg Museum of American Indians and Western Art - Permanent Collection, United Nations Watch of the World Jewish Congress, Geneva, Switzerland, United States Mission, Geneva, Switzerland, Residence of the Israeli Ambassador to the United States, Washington, DC, Ronald Lauder Collection, New York, NY, Fairfield University, Fairfield, CT, Glenn Janss Collection of American Realist Paintings, Vermont Council on the Arts, Michael Steinhardt Collection, Jerry Speyer Collection, Karen and William Lauder Collection, Isidore Newman School, Altamer Resort, Anguilla, British West Indies, Delaware Beverage Company Art Collection, to list a few.

Aronson became known for her landscapes. Garrit Henry wrote for the publication Art in America: "Jan Aronson has confessed that Abstract Expressionism is a major influence on her landscapes. With some looking, it’s easy to see that she is something of an expressionist herself. She has traveled endlessly in search of the sublime – she has hiked in the Himalayas and barged down the Amazon, and she knows well the American Northeast and West. How the human self perceives, pictures and, above all, enlarges upon the drama of nature is what Aronson’s work is about." And Mark Daniel Cohen wrote for the publication Art News: "Everything Aronson depicts has a quality of motion that is like the gesturing of a human body."

Aronson is noted for her portrait work as well. Having painted the likes of Arthur Hertzberg, Mariel Hemingway, Norman H. Nie and Edgar Miles Bronfman. The latter businessman and philanthropist was married to Aronson from 1994 till his death in 2013.

After the attack on the World Trade Center Aronson headed to ground zero. During her visit she noticed a piece of rust on one of the remaining steel columns. This inspired her Leaves Series, seeing leaves as an homage to the tragedy. Miranda McClintic wrote: "Aronson started the series with straightforward depictions of leaves, isolated from their natural context on complementary colored grounds. As time went on she increasingly monumentalized and abstracted their forms, layering different kinds of leaves, with contrasting colors, shapes and textures. The close-up camera views on which the paintings and watercolors of leaves are based allow for microscopic examination of multiple surface variations and tones, while their large scale, rich colors, and dense layering of paint transforms them into dramatic emblems.

As the series continued through 2004, Aronson focused increasingly on formal concerns and the evocation of vitality. In the paintings and watercolors of sea-grape leaves that she collected in Anguilla, the colors radiate tropical beauty, the compositions stress the complex patterns of leaf stems and veins, and the leaves are subjectified by filling the entire pictorial space."

Following the Leaves series Aronson began exploring the forms of rocks and water, which led to a series she calls While Rome Burns.

Aronson is a member of the National Association of Women Artists, Artists Equity and a Board Member of The Skowhegan School.

== Awards ==
Awards include:

- Painting Award - Stratton Arts Festival, Stratton, VT;
- Individual Artist Grant – Painting, Vermont Council on the Arts;
- Purchase Award - Illuminated Thoughts Juried Traveling Exhibition, Sponsored by: Vermont Council on the Arts; *Painting Award - 4 Winds Gallery Regional Art Exhibition, Ferrisburg, VT
