= Charles Bronfman =

Canadian politician (born 1931)

The Honourable Charles Bronfman PC CC
- Born: Charles Rosner Bronfman; June 27, 1931 (age 95); Montreal, Quebec, Canada
- Citizenship: Canada; United States
- Education: Selwyn House School; Trinity College School; McGill University
- Occupation: Businessman
- Spouses: Barbara Baerwald (m. 1961; div. 1982) Andrea Brett Morrison Cohen (m. 1982; died 2006) Bonita Roche (m. 2008; div. 2011) Rita Mayo (m. 2012)
- Children: 2, including Stephen
- Parent(s): Samuel Bronfman; Saidye Rosner Bronfman
- Relatives: Minda de Gunzburg (sister); Phyllis Lambert (sister); Edgar Bronfman Sr. (brother)
- Baseball career

Member of the Canadian

Baseball Hall of Fame
- Induction: 1984

Charles Bronfman, PC CC (born June 27, 1931) is a Canadian-American businessman and philanthropist and is a member of the Canadian Jewish Bronfman family. With an estimated net worth of $2.5 billion in 2023, Bronfman was ranked by Forbes as the 1,217th wealthiest person in the world.

== Biography ==
Bronfman was born into a Jewish family in Montreal. He is the son of Samuel Bronfman and Saidye Rosner Bronfman. He has two older sisters, the art patron Baroness Aileen "Minda" Bronfman de Gunzberg, and architecture expert and developer Phyllis Lambert. His older brother, Edgar Bronfman, Sr., was his fellow co-chair of Seagram. Edgar Bronfman Jr. is Edgar's son. He was educated at Selwyn House School in Montreal, Trinity College School in Port Hope, Ontario, and McGill University. Bronfman said he is Canadian in his heart but sought his dual citizenship in order to vote in the United States.

== Business career ==
Bronfman held various positions in the family's liquor empire, Seagram, from 1951 to 2000. In 1951 Bronfman's father Samuel Bronfman gave Charles a 33% ownership stake in Cemp Investments, a holding company for him and his 3 siblings which controlled the family's corporate empire. Under the leadership of Charles and brother Edgar, it controlled billions of dollars in liquor, real estate, oil and gas, and chemical companies.

Bronfman and his brother, Edgar, inherited the Seagram spirits empire in 1971 after the death of their father, Sam Bronfman. Bronfman is a former co-chairman of the Seagram Company Ltd. On the 2000 demise of the company: "It was a disaster, it is a disaster, it will be a disaster," he says. "It was a family tragedy."

Bronfman was also well known for his forays into professional sports. He was majority owner of Major League Baseball's Montreal Expos from the team's formation in 1968 until 1991. He sold the franchise for $100 million CAD to a consortium of local investors led by Claude Brochu on November 29, 1990. The sale was completed 6 1/2 months later on June 14, 1991. In 1982, a day after the Montreal Alouettes of the Canadian Football League collapsed due to financial troubles, Bronfman bought their remains and used them to start a new franchise, the Montreal Concordes. This venture proved far less successful – despite later rebranding the team as the Alouettes, the team folded prior to the start of the 1987 CFL season.

Since 1986, he has served as chairman of The Andrea and Charles Bronfman Philanthropies, Inc. He planned to close the foundation in 2016.

From November 1997 until July 2002, Bronfman was the chairman of the board of Koor Industries Ltd., one of Israel's largest investment holding companies. He is the co-chairman of the McGill Institute for the Study of Canada. From 1999 to 2001, Bronfman was the first chairman of the United Jewish Communities, the merged North American organization comprising United Jewish Appeal, the Council of Jewish Federations and United Israel Appeal.

In April 2013, Bronfman was one of 100 prominent American Jews who sent a letter to Israeli Prime Minister Benjamin Netanyahu urging him to "work closely" with Secretary of State John Kerry "to devise pragmatic initiatives, consistent with Israel's security needs, which would represent Israel's readiness to make painful territorial sacrifices for the sake of peace."

== Philanthropy ==
He and Michael Steinhardt co-founded Taglit Birthright, a program which provides a free, educational travel experience to Israel for young Jewish adults. Bronfman is one of its principal donors. Since 1999, the program has sent more than 700,000 young Jews from around the world on a 10-day free trip to Israel.

In 1991, Bronfman with billionaire Leslie Wexner formed the "Mega Group", a loosely organized club of some the wealthiest and most influential businessmen who were concerned with Jewish issues. Max Fisher, Michael Steinhardt, Leonard Abramson, Edgar Bronfman Sr., and Laurence Tisch were some of the members. The "Mega Group" would meet twice a year for two days of seminars related to the topic of philanthropy and Jewishness. In 1998, Steven Spielberg spoke about his personal religious journey, and later the group discussed Jewish summer camps. The "Mega Group", went on to inspire a number of philanthropic initiatives such as the Partnership for Excellence in Jewish Education, Birthright Israel, and the upgrading of national Hillel.

He was linked to scandal in 1999, when it was revealed that funds he had donated to social causes were transferred to Ehud Barak's election campaign for Prime Minister of Israel, to which he had previously contributed, among others. Bronfman was the largest donor to contribute to the renovation of the Tel Aviv Performing Arts Center and has also contributed to the Israel Museum. The Fredric R. Mann Auditorium was refurbished by Bronfman's donation, and reopened as the Charles Bronfman Auditorium, in May 2013.

Bronfman is chairman of the Andrea and Charles Bronfman Philanthropies Inc., a family of charitable foundations operating in Israel, the U.S., and Canada. Since its foundation in 1986, the charity spent more than $340 million to about 1,820 organizations. In 2016 Bonfman closed the charity, which was planned over years.The Charles Bronfman Prize, founded by Bronfman’s children, recognizes young humanitarians whose work reflects his values, spirit, and belief that a better world is possible. The first winner was Gift of Life Marrow Registry founder Jay Feinberg. He also founded the CRB Foundation, which runs educational enrichment classes in outlying areas in collaboration with the Education Ministry in Israel.

Bronfman was a founding co-chairman of Historica Canada, producers of the Heritage Minutes series of television shorts. It was at an early meeting of this foundation (originally the CAB Foundation) that he asked the members, "If television can use 30 seconds or 60 seconds to persuade people that Cadillacs or cornflakes are interesting, couldn't we also use that short piece of time to persuade Canadians that their history is interesting? You tell me how to do it, and I'll fund it." It was out of that discussion that the Heritage Minutes were conceived, piloted, distributed through cinemas and broadcasters across the country, and then confirmed as a major contribution of the foundation – which a few years later became Historica, recently merged with the Dominion Institute.

Bronfman joined the Giving Pledge, an initiative of the Bill & Melinda Gates Foundation. In 2022, he donated $5 million to McGill Institute for the Study of Canada (MISC), which he co-founded in 1994, for Conversations about Canada, launching with "Comparing Immigration Policies: Canada & the World" in 2023.

Bronfman was one of the first signees of the Jewish Future Pledge, a charitable campaign launched in 2020 modeled after The Giving Pledge to encourage American Jews to designate at least 50% of their charitable giving to Jewish- or Israel-related causes.

== Personal life ==
Bronfman has been married four times:

- Barbara Baerwald (1938 – 2021). Married 1961, divorced 1982. They had two children.
  - Stephen Bronfman runs the investment firm founded by his father, Claridge. He is married to Claudine Blondin.
  - Ellen Jane Bronfman is married to Andrew Hauptman. They are the founders of the private investment firm Andell Holdings, the former owner of the Chicago Fire Soccer Club.
- Andrea "Andy" Brett Morrison Cohen (1945 – 2006). They married in 1982. She died in 2006 after being struck by a taxi when she went out to walk her dog. She has three children from a previous marriage to Canadian manufacturer David Cohen, a grandson of Lyon Cohen and cousin of singer Leonard Cohen: Jeremy Cohen, Pippa Cohen, and Tony Cohen.
- Bonita "Bonnie" Roche. In 2008, married Roche, an architect, in New York City. They divorced in 2011, on amicable terms, celebrating their divorce with a lavish "divorce party."
- Rita Mayo. They married in 2012.

== Awards and honours ==
- 1981: Made an Officer of the Order of Canada
- 1990: Doctorate of Philosophy, Honoris Causa awarded from Hebrew University of Jerusalem
- 1990: Doctorate of Laws, Honoris Causa received from McGill University.
- 1992: Member of the Queen's Privy Council for Canada.
- 1992: Promoted to Companion of the Order of Canada
- 1992: Doctorate of Humane Letters, Honoris Causa from Brandeis University
- 1992: Doctorate of Laws, Honoris Causa from Concordia University
- 1993: Montreal Expos Hall of Fame
- 1995: Doctorate of Laws, Honoris Causa from the University of Waterloo
- 2000: Doctorate of Laws, Honoris Causa from the University of Toronto
- 2002: Bronfman, along with his wife Andrea, were awarded Honorary Citizenship of Jerusalem
- 2017: Doctor of Hebrew Letters, Honoris Causa from the Jewish Theological Seminary of America
- 2019: Honorary citizen, invited by the City of Montreal to sign the city's book of honour

== Works or publications ==
- Bronfman, Charles, and Jeffrey Solomon. The Art of Doing Good: Where Passion Meets Action. San Francisco: Jossey-Bass, 2012. ISBN 978-1-1182-8574-9
- Bronfman, Charles, and Jeffrey Solomon. The Art of Giving: Where the Soul Meets a Business Plan. San Francisco, CA: Jossey-Bass, 2010. ISBN 978-0-4705-0146-7
- Seagram Museum collection at Hagley Museum and Library (finding aid)
