= Israel Singer =

American Jewish activist

Israel Singer is an American rabbi and political scientist who was Secretary General of the World Jewish Congress (WJC) from 1986 to 2001.

== Life ==
Singer grew up in Brooklyn, the son of Austrian refugees. He graduated from Yeshiva Torah Vodaath high school in 1960.

Singer teaches political science at Touro University, New York, Lander College for Men, and previously taught at the Bar-Ilan University in Israel.

Singer served as Secretary-General of the World Jewish Congress (WJC) from 1986 until 2001. In October 2001, he was elected chairman of the Governing Board WJC. In 2002, he was elected president of the Conference on Jewish Material Claims against Germany, the "Claims Conference". In June 2002, he was elected chairman of the International Jewish Committee for Interreligious Consultations (IJCIC). On January 11, 2005, Singer resigned as Secretary General of the WJC at its Plenary Meeting in Brussels. A replacement was elected, and Singer was elected to the Chair of the WJC Policy Committee.

During Singer's term at WJC, he was active in exposing and publicizing the Nazi past of United Nations Secretary General Kurt Waldheim.

Singer also acted as vice-chairman of the Yad Vashem Council.

== WJC Policy Council ==
In early 2006, the WJC reached a settlement with the New York State Attorney General's office regarding its finances. Singer described the filings as baseless "nuisance suit[s]" and reiterated his innocence.

== Books ==
- Levin, Itamar; translated by Natasha Dornberg; forewords by Edgar Bronfman, Israel Singer, and Avraham Burg (1999). The last deposit: Swiss banks and Holocaust victims' accounts. Westport, Conn.: Praeger. ISBN 978-0275965204.
- Gregg J. Rickman (1999). Swiss Banks and Jewish Souls. Transaction Publishers. ISBN 978-1560004264.
