= Matthew Bronfman =

American businessman and philanthropist

- Born: July 16, 1959 (age 67); New York City, United States
- Education: Williams College, Harvard Business School
- Spouses: Fiona Woods (m. 1982–1997) Lisa Belzberg (m. 1997–2002) Stacey Kaye (m. 2005–2016) Melanie Lavie (m. 2016)
- Children: 9
- Parent(s): Edgar Bronfman Sr. Ann Loeb Bronfman
- Relatives: Adam Bronfman (brother); Edgar Bronfman Jr. (brother); Clare Bronfman (half-sister); Sara Bronfman (half-sister); Samuel Bronfman (grandfather); John Langeloth Loeb Sr. (grandfather); Nicholas M. Loeb (cousin)

Matthew Bronfman (born July 16, 1959) is an American businessman, entrepreneur and philanthropist. A member of the Bronfman family, he is the son of prominent businessman and philanthropist Edgar Bronfman Sr.

== Biography ==
Bronfman is one of seven children, one of five from Ann (Loeb) and Edgar Miles Bronfman. His mother was the daughter of John Langeloth Loeb Sr. (a Wall Street investment banker whose company was a predecessor of Shearson Lehman/American Express) and Frances Lehman (a member of the Lehman family that founded the Lehman Brothers banking firm). They divorced in 1973.

Bronfman attended the Cardigan Mountain School, the Taft School, and graduated from Williams College in 1981. After working at Goldman Sachs he attended Harvard Business School, where he graduated in 1985. Bronfman began his career at Goldman Sachs and the Cadillac Fairview Corporation.

As one of the largest American Jewish investors in the Israeli economy, Bronfman is also a shareholder in IKEA Israel, Israel Discount Bank and the Shufersal supermarket chain. He is also the chairman and CEO of BHB holdings, a family holding company. Previously, He was a managing director at ACI Holdings, a private equity firm based in New York.

He is a former director of Jenny Craig, BizBash Media Inc., Palace Candles, Inc., EARNEST Partners, LLC, Tweeter Home Entertainment Group Inc., and James River Group, Inc.

== Philanthropy ==
Bronfman is the chairman of the international steering committee of Limmud FSU, a program focused on strengthening the Jewish identities of Russian-speaking Jews, and the chairman of the American Jewish Committee’s ACCESS, which trains Jewish professionals to shape public opinion and policy around the world. He is also the managing principal of the Treetops Foundation, a charity focused on Jewish philanthropy and is on the boards of 92nd Street Y and the Canadian Centre for Architecture.

== Personal life ==
Bronfman has been married four times. He married first wife Fiona (née Woods) in 1982, after meeting her at Williams College; they separated in 1993, and finalized their divorce in June 1997. They had three children, Eli Miles, Jeremy Samuel, and Gabriela Talia. In December 1997, he married Lisa Belzberg, daughter of Samuel Belzberg and sister-in-law of Strauss Zelnick, while she was eight and a half months pregnant with their second child. They met through Les Wexner's religious studies course at Wexner's Heritage Foundation. They divorced in 2002 after Belzberg was photographed in an intimate pose with Bill Clinton by Newsweek. The couple had three children, Sasha Eliana, Tess Emanuella, and Ezekiel "Zeke" Belzberg. In January 2005, he wed Stacey Kaye on the island of Anguilla, and they divorced in 2016 with one child, Coby Benjamin. In April 2017, he married Israeli Melanie Lavie, with whom he had two children, James Raphael and Stella Ann.

He currently resides in Manhattan. His sons Jeremy and Eli founded Lincoln Avenue Capital, a real estate investor and developer in affordable housing. His son, Zeke, is the cofounder and CEO of XED Beverages.
