= Edgar Bronfman Jr. =

American businessman

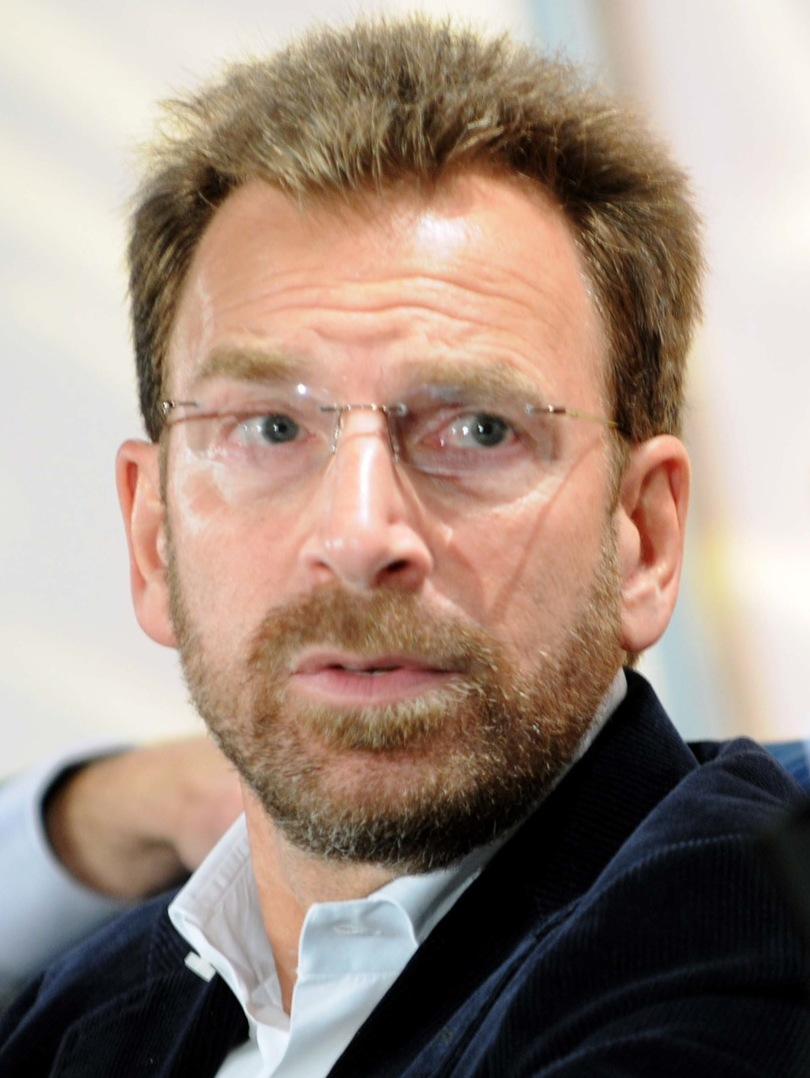
- Bronfman Jr. in 2008
- Born: Edgar Miles Bronfman Jr. May 16, 1955 (age 71); New York City, U.S.
- Occupations: Businessman, media executive, film producer, theater producer
- Spouses: Sherry Brewer (m. 1979; div. 1991) Clarissa Alcock San Román (m. 1993)
- Children: 7, including Benjamin and Hannah
- Parent(s): Edgar Bronfman Sr. Ann Loeb
- Relatives: Adam Bronfman (brother); Matthew Bronfman (brother); Clare Bronfman (half-sister); Sara Bronfman (half-sister); Samuel Bronfman (grandfather); John Langeloth Loeb Sr. (grandfather); Nicholas M. Loeb (cousin)

Edgar Miles Bronfman Jr. (born May 16, 1955) is an American businessman, film and theater producer, and media executive who is a managing partner at Accretive LLC. He previously was CEO of Warner Music Group from 2004 to 2011, and was its chairman from 2011 to 2012. Bronfman was the CEO of WMG during its May 2011 sale to Access Industries. In August 2011, he became Chairman of the company. Bronfman previously was CEO of Seagram and vice-chairman of Vivendi Universal. Bronfman expanded and later divested ownership of the Seagram Company, and also worked as a producer, and songwriter under the pseudonyms Junior Miles and Sam Roman. He is Executive Chairman of FuboTV.

== Early life ==
Born in 1955, Edgar Jr. ("Efer" to friends) is the son of Edgar Miles Bronfman and the grandson of Samuel Bronfman, patriarch of one of the wealthiest and most influential Jewish families in Canada. The Bronfman family gained its fortunes through the Seagram Company, an alcohol distilling company. Edgar Jr. is the second of five children of Ann (née Loeb) and Edgar Miles Bronfman. His mother was the daughter of John Langeloth Loeb Sr. (a Wall Street investment banker whose company was a predecessor of Shearson Lehman/American Express) and Frances Lehman (a scion of the Lehman Brothers banking firm).

== Business career ==
=== Film production ===
Bronfman proceeded to a brief career in entertainment in the 1970s as a film and Broadway producer. The summer before his final year of high school, in 1972, he was a credited producer on the film, The Blockhouse. He briefly had a production company, with Steve Sheppard, called Sagittarius. His Efer Productions company was signed by Universal Studios in 1977 to a three-year movie production contract. He produced the unsuccessful film The Border (1982), which starred Jack Nicholson.

=== Seagram Company ===
In 1982, Bronfman returned to the Seagram Company, before moving to London to become managing director of Seagram Europe. In 1984, Bronfman returned to New York as President of the House of Seagram, the company's U.S. marketing division. By 1994, he became the Chief Executive Officer, where he began a move away from the traditional liquor business and into entertainment. According to Cigar Aficionado, Edgar Jr. led the family on a series of disastrous business deals, ultimately losing the family's ownership of Seagram.

The first step in this diversification was the widely criticised sale of Seagram's stake in DuPont. In 1981, Edgar Bronfman Sr. had sold Seagram's stake in Conoco to DuPont, in exchange for almost 25% of the chemical giant. This stake in DuPont, by 1995, represented about 70% of Seagram's total earnings. Nevertheless, Bronfman Jr., acting as Seagram CEO, approached DuPont about buying back its shares.

With the proceeds of the $9 billion sale (equivalent to $19 billion in 2025), Bronfman Jr. went on an expansion into the entertainment business, in music through the acquisition of PolyGram ($10.6 billion), and in film entertainment through MCA and Universal Pictures ($5.7 billion) from Matsushita. However, the new entertainment conglomerate he created had a brief life, before needing a strategic partner. Bronfman Jr., then led Seagram into a controversial all-stock acquisition by French conglomerate Vivendi in 2000 for $34 billion. Bronfman Jr., became an executive at the new company, Vivendi Universal, but the Seagram company effectively lost control of its entertainment businesses. Meanwhile, the beverage division—the core of Seagram — was acquired by Pernod Ricard (39 per cent) and Diageo (61 per cent) for $8.15 billion.

In December 2001, Bronfman announced he was stepping down from his executive role at Vivendi Universal, but remaining as vice chair of the board.

In 2002, Bronfman joined private investment firm Accretive LLC as General Partner. The firm focuses on conducting deep market research and hand-selecting firms to back. Among its past projects are Accretive Health and Fandango (ticket service). Companies it currently backs include human resources firm AlphaStaff and small-business insurance company Insureon.

=== Warner Music Group ===
On February 27, 2004, Bronfman finalized the acquisition of Warner Music Group (WMG) from Time Warner with equity partners Thomas H. Lee Partners and Bain Capital for $2.6 billion. He was chairman and CEO of the music company for the following seven years. WMG held an initial public offering of stock in 2005 (NYSE: WMG), and was the only standalone major music company to be publicly traded. While the stock has fallen from a high in 2005 of over $30 per share, the company has nonetheless produced double-digit growth in its digital business, increased its market share, and delivered stable revenue performance despite a drastic music industry decline during the same period. In 2008, The New York Times reported that WMG's Atlantic Records became the first major record label to generate more than half of its music sales in the U.S. from digital products.

In May, 2011, WMG and Bronfman announced the company's sale to Access Industries for US$3.3 billion in cash. Access is controlled by Soviet-born billionaire Len Blavatnik, a former board member and still-substantial shareholder of WMG at the time of the purchase announcement. The sale, coming after a three-month bidding process, "serves the best interests of stockholders as well as the best interests of music fans, our recording artists and songwriters, and the wonderful people of this company," according to a statement released by Bronfman. CEO Bronfman would continue in his post in the transaction, though further job cuts were also foreseen. The investment group which has owned the company since 2004 was said to have received a positive return on its investment.

In August 2011, Bronfman became Chairman of Warner Music and Stephen Cooper became CEO. He stepped down as chairman on January 31, 2012. In February 2017, it was reported that Meredith Corp. and a group of investors led by Bronfman Jr. were considering pursuing Time Inc. On November 26, 2017, it was announced that Meredith Corporation would acquire Time Inc. in a $2.8 billion deal.

Bronfman is currently the chairman of Endeavor, an international non-profit development organisation that supports entrepreneurs.

=== Waverley Capital ===
In 2017, it was announced that Bronfman would be launching a new venture capital firm called Waverley Capital, alongside Luminari Capital founder Daniel Leff. This firm would invest in "innovative and disruptive" companies within both technology and entertainment, with offices in New York and Palo Alto, California, with a Los Angeles office expected to open in the future.

In 2020, Bronfman was named the Executive Chairman of sports streaming service FuboTV after the leading the merger of FuboTV with Facebank Group. Bronfman is both a direct investor in FuboTV and an investor through his firm Waverley Capital.

== Music career ==
In 1973, Bronfman began a songwriting career under the pseudonyms Junior Miles and Sam Roman. He often collaborated with Bruce Roberts on songs like "Whisper in the Dark", which he gave to Dionne Warwick to record in thanks for introducing him to his first wife, Sherry. Bronfman also co-wrote "To Love You More", which was recorded by Celine Dion, and Barbra Streisand's "If I Didn't Love You".

== Personal life ==
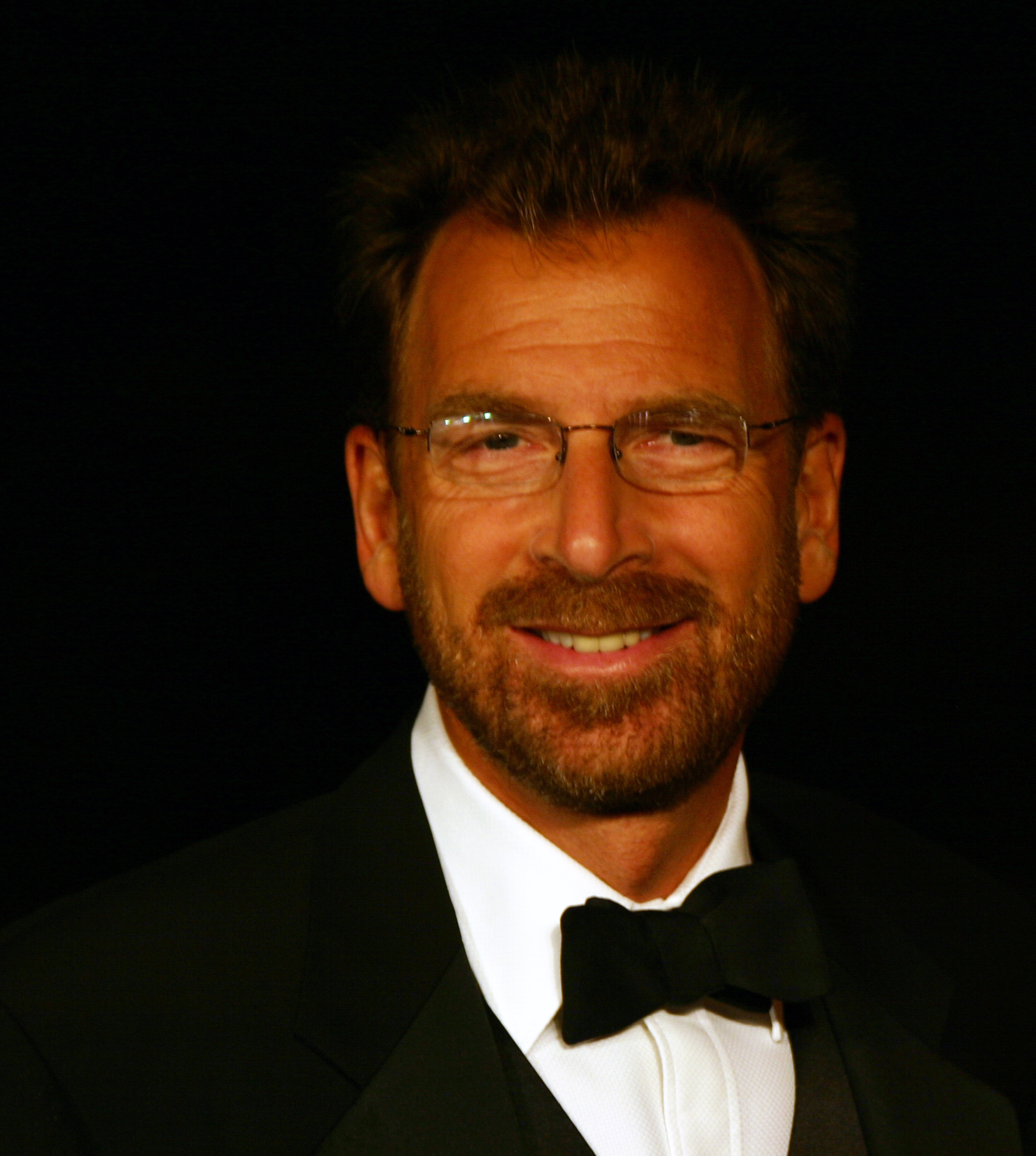
Edgar Bronfman Jr. celebrating Ralph Lauren's 40th Anniversary at the Conservancy Garden, Central Park, New York City, 2007

Edgar M. Bronfman Jr., is the son of Edgar Bronfman Sr., the billionaire businessman and longtime president of the World Jewish Congress who died aged 84 in 2013. He is the half-brother of Clare Bronfman, who as a 39-year-old was charged in 2018 in a NXIVM sex-trafficking case.

In 1979, Bronfman married his first wife, the actress Sherry Brewer, in New Orleans. Bronfman's father did not approve of the marriage because Brewer was Black. "I very much wanted for him to end the relationship, because I told him, all marriages are difficult enough without the added stress of totally different backgrounds", Bronfman Sr. wrote in his memoirs. "Sherry offered to convert [to Judaism], which though well intentioned, was not the point."

Bronfman and Brewer eloped and he and his father remained estranged. The couple had three children before they divorced in 1991: Benjamin (born 1982), Vanessa, and Hannah (born 1987).

In 1993 Bronfman married Clarisa Alcock San Román, a Catholic, the daughter of Frank Alcock Pérez-Matos, a Venezuelan oil executive of half British descent, and Dinorah San Román Strup. They have four children: Aaron, Bettina, Erik, and Clarissa.

== Insider trading conviction ==
On January 21, 2011, Bronfman was found guilty in French court of insider trading as Vivendi chief and received a 15-month suspended sentence and a €5m fine. Considering the jail sentences handed out to other executives for similar convictions, BNN reporter Michael Kane told CTV News "The fact that the judge suspended the jail time could be looked at as getting off lightly, perhaps." He appealed the decision in 2011.

== Stance on music copyright infringement ==
At the height of file sharing service Napster's popularity, Bronfman was a leading opponent of the illegal use of peer-to-peer technology. As CEO of Universal, he helped lead the music industry's opposition to Napster, likening it to slavery and Soviet communism.

In 2006, WMG was the first major media company to create a business model around user-generated content and, more recently, has been pushing for ways to monetise the popularity of P2P networks on college campuses.

In late 2006 in an interview with Reuters, Bronfman caused a stir by admitting that his children have copyright infringing music. He claims to have delivered punishment for this but wants it to remain within the realm of the family.

Lately, Bronfman may have revised his judgement. During the GSMA Mobile Asia Congress, he told the audience that mobile operators should not make the same mistakes that the music industry has:

We used to fool ourselves ... We used to think our content was perfect just exactly as it was. We expected our business would remain blissfully unaffected even as the world of interactivity, constant connection and file sharing was exploding. And of course we were wrong. How were we wrong? By standing still or moving at a glacial pace, we inadvertently went to war with consumers by denying them what they wanted and could otherwise find and as a result of course, consumers won.

In 2010 Bronfman changed his philosophy on the music industry's online business models, stating that he does not support free advertising supported models. He said that WMG will focus on promoting services that require payment, that will appeal to the population that already pays for downloads in stores such as iTunes.

The 'get all your music you want for free, and then maybe with a few bells and whistles we can move you to a premium price' strategy is not the kind of approach to business that we will be supporting in the future.

Business positions
Preceded by –	Chief Executive Officer of Warner Music Group; 2004 – August 19, 2011	Succeeded by Stephen Cooper
