= Edgar Bronfman Sr. =

Canadian-American businessman (1929–2013)

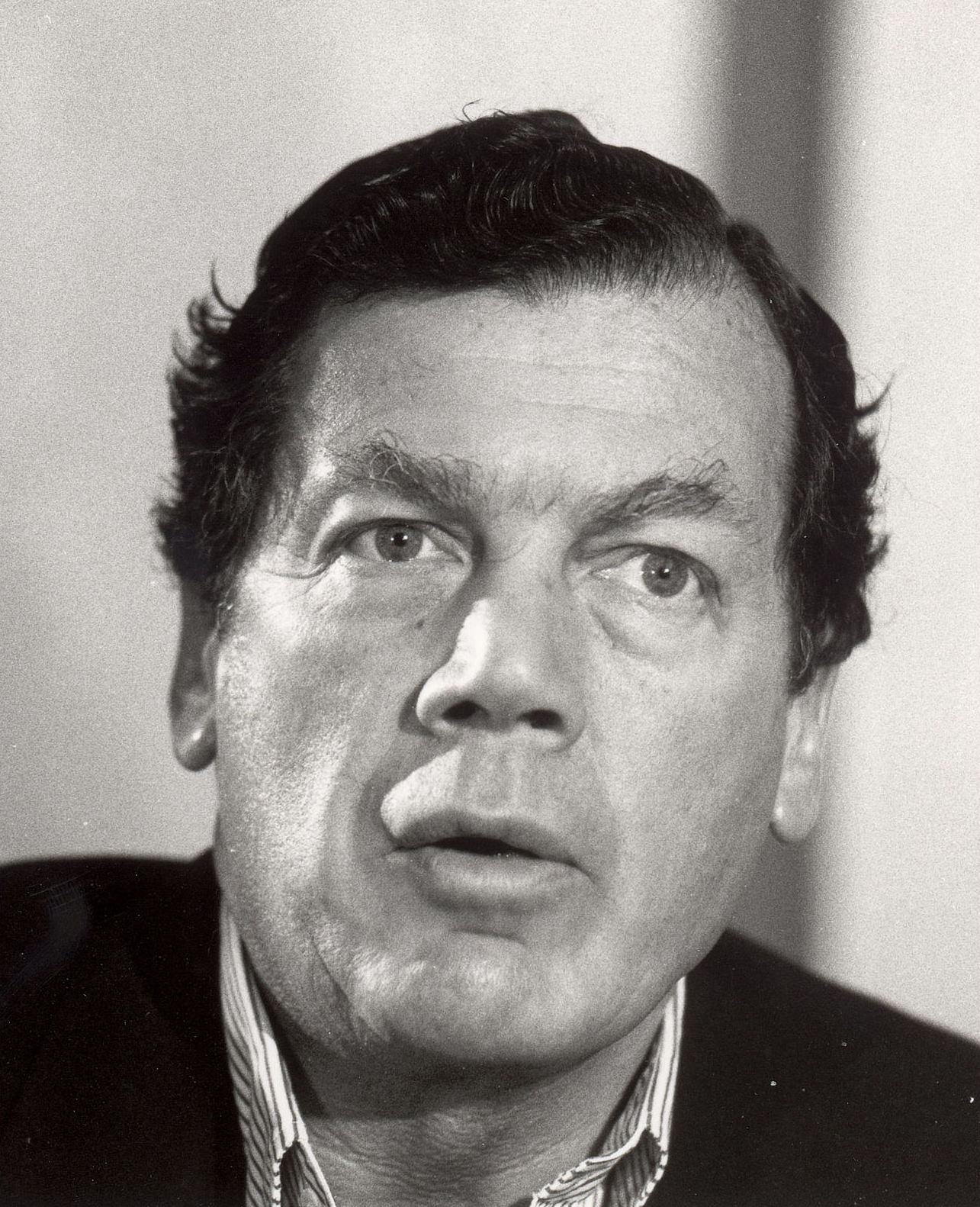
- Bronfman in 1989
- Born: Edgar Miles Bronfman; June 20, 1929; Montreal, Quebec, Canada
- Died: December 21, 2013 (aged 84); New York City, U.S.
- Citizenship: Canada; United States
- Education: Williams College; McGill University (BCom)
- Occupations: Businessman, philanthropist
- Spouses: Ann Margaret Loeb (m. 1953; div. 1973) Lady Carolyn Townshend (m. 1973; annul. 1974) Rita Eileen Webb (m. 1975; div. 1983): Rita Eileen Webb (remarried & divorced again); Jan Aronson (m. 1994)
- Children: 7, including: Edgar Bronfman Jr.; Matthew Bronfman; Adam Bronfman; Sara Bronfman; Clare Bronfman
- Parent(s): Samuel Bronfman; Saidye Rosner Bronfman
- Relatives: Phyllis Lambert (sister); Charles Bronfman (brother)

Edgar Miles Bronfman (June 20, 1929 – December 21, 2013) was a Canadian-American businessman. He worked for his family's distilled beverage firm, Seagram, eventually becoming president, treasurer and CEO. As president of the World Jewish Congress, Bronfman initiated diplomacy with the Soviet Union, which resulted in the Soviet government legitimizing the Hebrew language in the USSR and contributed to Soviet Jews being legally able to practice their religion and immigrate to Israel.

== Biography ==
Bronfman was born into the Jewish-Canadian Bronfman family in Montreal, the son of Samuel Bronfman, a Russian who had immigrated to Canada with his parents, and Saidye Rosner Bronfman, a native of Manitoba born to Eastern European immigrants. They raised their four children in Montreal.

In 1925, Sam and his brother, Allan, built the family's first liquor distillery near Montreal. They later bought a distillery owned by the Seagram family and incorporated the name. The U.S. subsidiary of the Seagram Company Ltd. opened in 1933; Edgar Bronfman would later take charge of the subsidiary.

Bronfman had two older sisters: architect Phyllis Lambert, and Minda de Gunzburg, who married Baron Alain de Gunzburg (1925–2004), a great grandson of Joseph Günzburg. Bronfman also had a younger brother, Charles Bronfman. The Bronfmans "kept a kosher home, and the children received religious schooling on weekends. During the week, Edgar and Charles were among a handful of Jews sent to private Anglophone schools, where they attended chapel and ate pork."

Bronfman attended Selwyn House School in Montreal, and Trinity College School in Port Hope, Ontario, Canada. He next attended Williams College, then transferred to McGill University, where he graduated in 1951 with a bachelor's degree in commerce.

== Career ==
=== Seagram ===
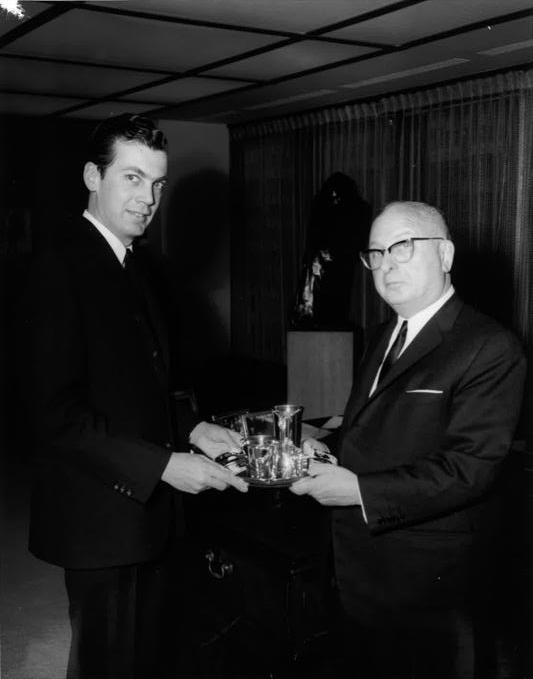
Bronfman with his father, Sam Bronfman

After graduating from McGill University with a B.A. degree, in 1951, he joined the family business, where he worked as an accounting clerk and apprentice taster. In 1953, he took over as head of the Seagram U.S. subsidiary, Joseph E. Seagram & Sons. He increased the range of products sold by the company, improved distribution, and expanded the number of countries in which Seagram's products were sold. In 1966, Cemp Investments, which managed the family's investments, bought 820,000 shares of MGM and, in 1969, Bronfman took over the chairmanship of MGM, albeit briefly.

Following his father's death, in 1971, Bronfman took over as president, treasurer and director of Distillers Corporation-Seagram Ltd. His son, Edgar Jr., succeeded him as chief executive officer of the company in 1994.

=== World Jewish Congress ===
When former World Jewish Congress president Philip Klutznick stepped down in 1979, Bronfman was asked to take over as acting head of the organization, then was formally elected president by the Seventh Plenary Assembly, in January 1981. Together with his deputy, Israel Singer, Bronfman led the World Jewish Congress. Initiatives such as those seeking to help free Soviet Jewry; to expose Austrian president Kurt Waldheim's Nazi past; and to help victims of the Holocaust and their heirs to acquire compensation (including by Swiss banks) raised Bronfman's international profile during the 1980s and 1990s.

==== Initiatives ====
===== Soviet Jewry =====
In 1983, Bronfman suggested that "American Jews should abandon their strongest weapon, the Jackson–Vanik amendment, as a sign of goodwill that challenges the Soviets to respond in kind."

After Mikhail Gorbachev's ascension in 1985, Bronfman's New York Times message began to resonate with the public. In early 1985, Bronfman secured an invitation to the Kremlin and on September 8–11, visited Moscow, becoming the first World Jewish Congress President to be formally received in Moscow by Soviet Officials. Carrying a note from Shimon Peres, Bronfman met with Gorbachev, and initiated talks of a Soviet Jewish airlift. It is said that Peres' note called on the Soviet Union to resume diplomatic relations with Israel.

In a Washington Post profile a few months after the September trip, Bronfman laid out what he thought had been accomplished during his September meetings. He said, "There's going to be a buildup of pressure through the business community. The Russians know the Soviet Jewry issue is tied to trade ... My guess is that over a period of time, five to ten years, some of our goals will be achieved." Author Gal Beckerman says in his When They Come For Us We'll Be Gone, "Bronfman had a business man's understanding of the Soviet Jewish issue. It was all a matter of negotiation, of calculating what the Russians really wanted and leveraging that against emigration."

In March 1987, Bronfman, along with fellow delegates of the World Jewish Congress, flew to Moscow once again. Bronfman held three days of discussions with senior Soviet officials. Together, Bronfman and the World Jewish Congress delegates advocated for the freeing of the Jews living under Soviet rule.

On June 25, 1982, Bronfman became the first representative of a Jewish organization to speak before the United Nations. Speaking before the Special Session on Disarmament, Bronfman said, "world peace cannot tolerate the denial of the legitimacy of Israel or any other nation-state ... [and the] charge that Zionism is racism is an abomination."

Bronfman's goals for the visit were threefold. In his book, The Making of a Jew, he explained: first, he called for the release of all so-called Prisoners of Zion, the Jews imprisoned for expressing a desire to emigrate to Israel. Bronfman also wanted freedom for Jews in the Soviet Union to practice their religion. Finally, he called for the freedom for Soviet Jews to learn Hebrew, which was forbidden at the time.

A year later, in 1988, Bronfman returned to Moscow to meet with Soviet Foreign Minister Eduard Shevardnadze. This trip resulted in the Soviets promising to legalize the teaching of Hebrew in the Soviet Union and to establish a Jewish cultural center in Moscow. Bronfman said of this visit, "By their actions, they are indicating that they are eager to get the question of Jewish rights and emigration off the bargaining table. And it is actions, rather than simply words, that count."

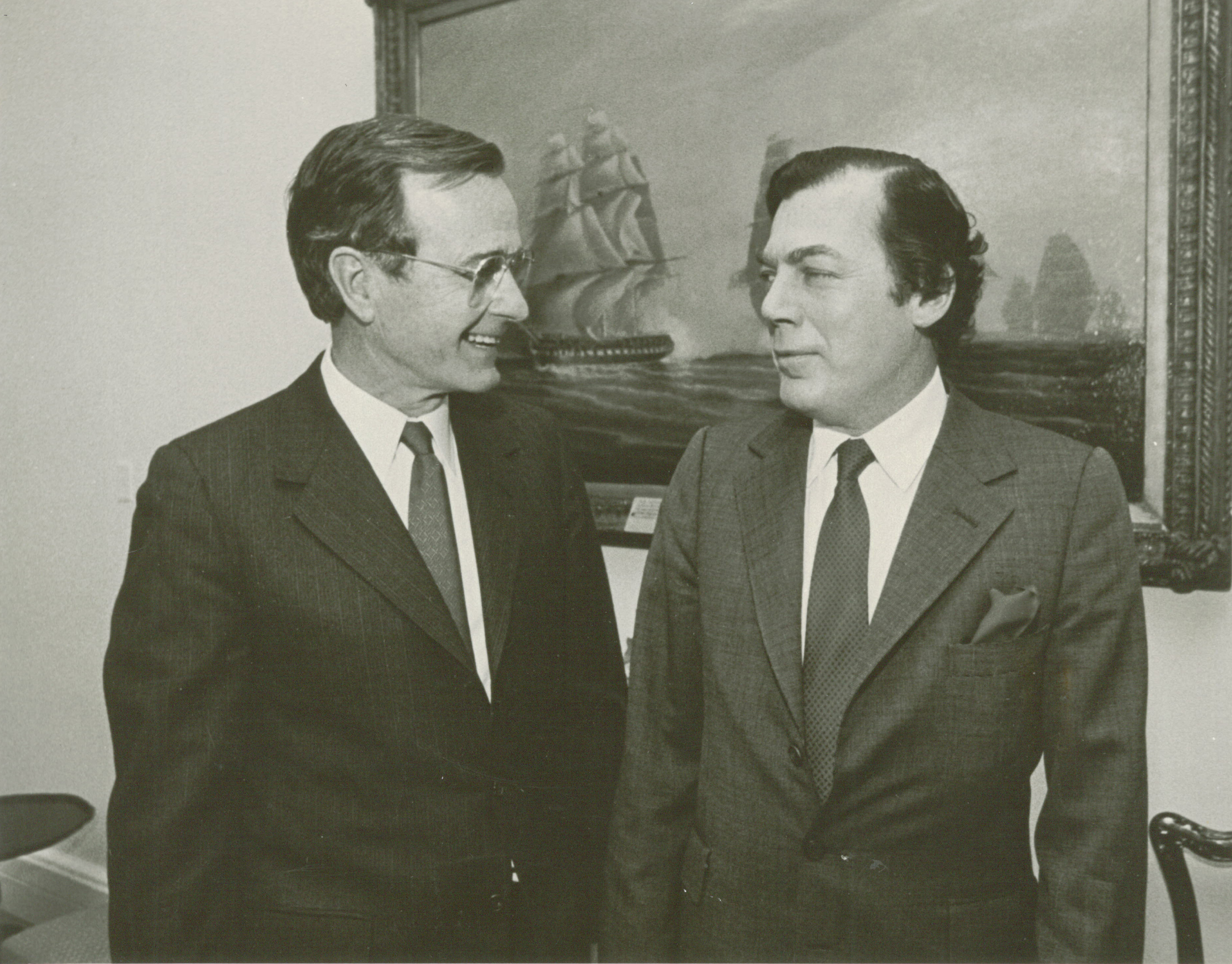
Bronfman (right) and President George H. W. Bush

===== Kurt Waldheim =====
In 1986, during Bronfman's presidency, the World Jewish Congress accused Austrian president Kurt Waldheim of covering up his past connections to the Nazi Party. It was when Waldheim became a candidate for president of Austria that the World Jewish Congress first published material showing Waldheim's active duty in the German army during wartime. This evidence was later used to prove that Waldheim must have known about the deportation of Jews to concentration camps, though Waldheim's service as an Austrian in the German army cannot itself be considered a war crime. Waldheim had served as an intelligence officer in a unit of the army that participated in the transfer of Greek Jews to death camps. The allegations against Waldheim resulted in public embarrassment for the then-Austrian president.

On May 5, 1987, Bronfman spoke to the World Jewish Congress saying Waldheim was "part and parcel of the Nazi killing machine". Waldheim subsequently filed a lawsuit against Bronfman, but dropped the suit shortly after, due to a lack of evidence in his favor.

According to Joel Bainerman, in 1991 he was appointed to the International Jewish Committee for Inter-religious Consultations to conduct official contacts between the Vatican and the State of Israel.

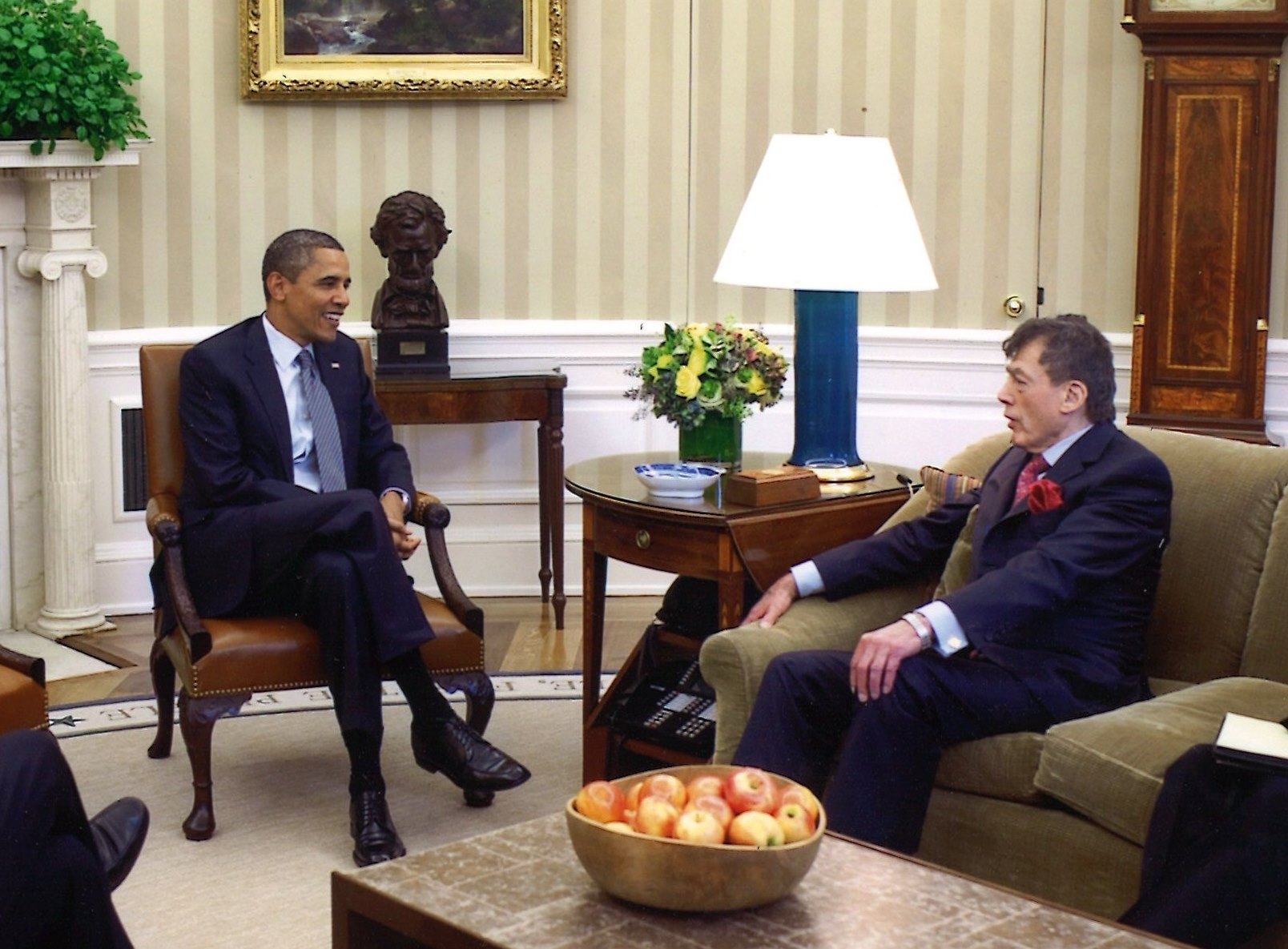
Bronfman and President Barack Obama

===== Swiss bank restitution =====
In the late 1990s, Bronfman championed the cause of restitution from Switzerland for Holocaust survivors. Bronfman began an initiative that led to a $1.25 billion settlement from Swiss banks. This settlement aimed to resolve claims "that they hoarded bank accounts opened by Jews who were murdered by the Nazis". The Swiss banks, the United States Government, and Jewish groups investigated unclaimed assets deposited by European Jews into Swiss banks before the Holocaust. Negotiations began in 1995 between the U.S. and Switzerland. The parties reached a settlement in August 1998, and signed the $1.25 billion settlement in January 1999. In exchange for the settlement money, both parties agreed to release the Swiss banks and government from any claims regarding the Holocaust. The settlement was officially approved on November 22, 2000, by Judge Edward R. Korman.

===== Israel =====
Bronfman was accused by another WJC official of "perfidy" when he wrote a letter to President Bush in mid-2003 urging Bush to pressure Israel to curb construction of its controversial West Bank separation barrier, co-signed by former Secretary of State Lawrence Eagleburger. Former Israeli prime minister Shimon Peres said in support of Bronfman, "Clearly, issues that are open for debate in Israel should be open for debate in the Jewish world."

==== Resignation ====
Bronfman stepped down from his post as president on May 7, 2007, amid scandals and turmoil about Israel Singer. Bronfman's leadership is known for transforming the World Jewish Congress into the powerful organization it is today. As president, Bronfman is remembered most for his diplomacy with the Soviet Union in freeing Soviet Jews.

At his memorial held in January 2014, Former Secretary of State Hillary Clinton said of Bronfman, "Edgar was never shy of pressing an issue in the face of injustice," as she spoke about the many causes he championed in his lifetime.

== Personal life ==
=== Marriages and children ===
Bronfman was married five times (twice to his third wife).

- Ann Margaret Loeb (1932–2011). In 1953, he married Loeb, a Jewish-American banking heiress. Loeb was the daughter of John Langeloth Loeb Sr. and Frances Lehman. They divorced in 1973. They had five children:
  - Samuel Bronfman II – On August 9, 1975, Samuel was abducted in New York. The abductors were acquitted of kidnapping by claiming Bronfman II was a co-conspirator, but convicted of extortion charges and spent several years in prison. The ransom money was recovered. The defense attorney wrote a memoir before his death in 2020, confessing that the defense was a lie, and Bronfman II had been an innocent victim. Samuel was married to Melanie Mann.
  - Edgar Bronfman Jr.
  - Matthew Bronfman
  - Bhavani Lev née Holly Bronfman – His only daughter with Loeb moved to India and, in 1997, co-founded, with her husband, Israeli-citizen Yoav Lev, Organic India, an organic food and supplements company based in Lucknow, India. Fabindia purchased a 40% stake in Organic India in 2013. She is a convert to Hinduism and has taken the name Bhavani Lev.
  - Adam Bronfman, managing director of The Samuel Bronfman Foundation.
- Lady Carolyn Townshend. In 1973, soon after his divorce from Loeb, he married Townshend, the daughter of the 7th Marquess Townshend. The couple separated after 10 days and their marriage was annulled in 1974.
- Rita Eileen Webb, later Georgiana "George" Bronfman. In 1975, he married Webb, then 25, who converted to Judaism and is the daughter of Barry and Eileen Webb, proprietors of an Essex country pub, Ye Old Nosebag. Webb and Bronfman divorced in 1983 and were later remarried, but again divorced. ("After the second divorce, she began a brief but tempestuous affair with Lorenzo Ricciardi [spouse of Mirella Ricciardi], an Italian filmmaker in his 60s. He was arrested in 1990 for trying to kill her." In 2007, Webb married English actor Nigel Havers.) Bronfman and Webb had two children together:
  - Sara Bronfman (born 1976) – She is married to Libyan businessman Basit Igtet; they have one daughter. She was sued in a 2018 regarding her NXIVM activities.
  - Clare Bronfman (born 1979), who was convicted in the 2020 NXIVM 'sex cult' case.
- Jan Aronson. In 1994, he married the artist Jan Aronson.

=== NXIVM ===
In 2003, a Forbes magazine article reported that Bronfman took a course from NXIVM under the leadership of Keith Raniere, endorsing it, but had since "grown troubled" due to the "emotional and financial investment" daughters Clare and Sara were giving to Raniere's group, remarking that Clare had loaned NXIVM $2 million, though she denied this. Bronfman was quoted stating, "I think it's a cult." In 2018, Raniere, then daughter Clare and her long-time mentor NXIVM president Nancy Salzman, among others, were arrested on federal charges in connection with NXIVM. In September 2018, daughter Sara was named the defendant in a 2018 class-action suit regarding her NXIVM activities.

== Death ==
Bronfman died on December 21, 2013, at his home in Manhattan. He was 84. Bronfman was survived by his widow, Aronson, seven children, 24 grandchildren and two great-grandchildren at the time of his death.

== Philanthropy ==
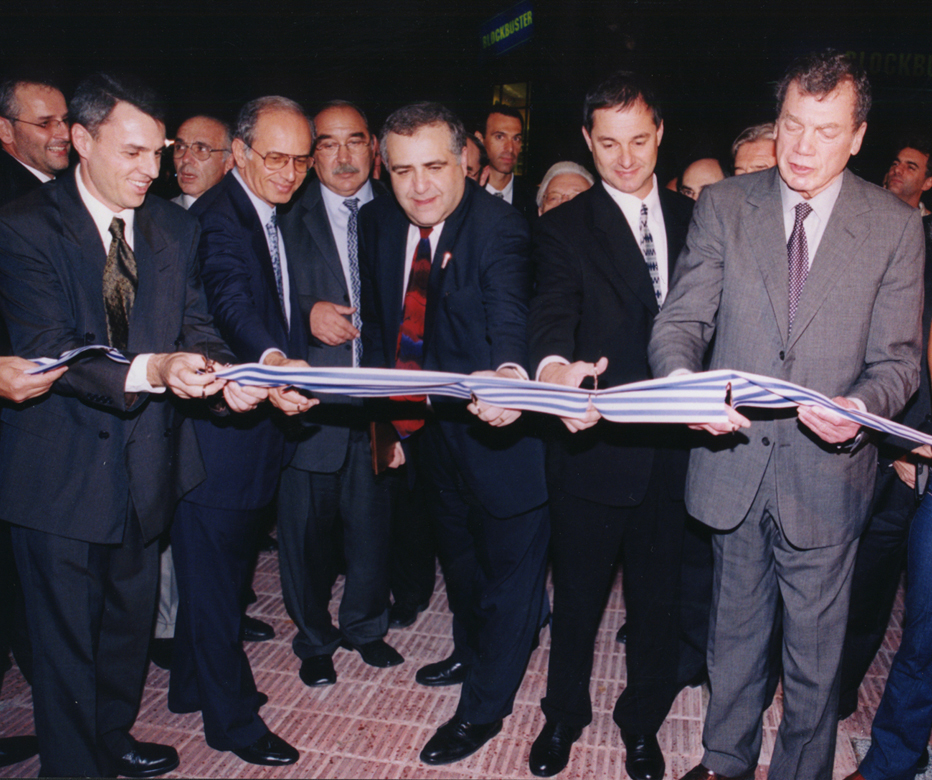
Bronfman at the founding of Hillel of Uruguay

Bronfman was a philanthropist who gave large amounts of money to Jewish causes, including Hillel: The Foundation for Jewish Campus Life, which he was credited with helping revive together with Hillel president Richard Joel in the 1990s. The Hillel at New York University is called The Edgar M. Bronfman Center for Jewish Student Life, known by students just as "Bronfman". Bronfman established the Bronfman Youth Fellowships in Israel, a leadership program for Jewish youth, and provided the funding for MyJewishLearning.com, a digital media entity that includes Kveller, a popular Jewish parenting site.

His mother has a concert hall named after her in Montreal, the Saidye Bronfman Centre, and a building at McGill University is named after his father.

Bronfman was also the founder and president of The Samuel Bronfman Foundation, whose work is informed by these four principles: "Jewish renaissance is grounded in Jewish learning, Jewish youth shape the future of the Jewish people, vibrant Jewish communities are open and inclusive, and that all Jews are a single family."

Major points of focus for The Samuel Bronfman Foundation are pluralism, intermarriage, community engagement – especially youth – and making Jewish knowledge accessible to Jews of all backgrounds. It is known for its work with the following grantees:

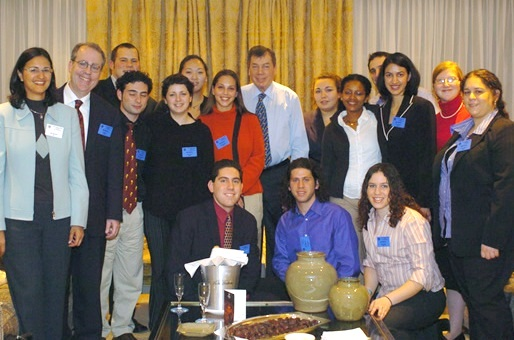
Bronfman meets with Hillel Students

- In 1987, Bronfman founded The Bronfman Youth Fellowships in Israel, a network of 1,000 young Jews from Israel and North America that includes some of today's most inspiring Jewish writers, thinkers and leaders. The Bronfman Youth Fellowships tap future influencers at a formative point in their lives, their final year of high school, and immerses them in an intensive exploration of Jewish text study, pluralism and social responsibility. Previous directors of the Fellowship include Rabbi Michael Paley, Rabbi Avi Weinstein, Rabbi Mishael Zion and currently, Becky Voorwinde. Past faculty members include Rabbi Sharon Cohen Anisfeld, Rabbi Andy Bachman and Rabbi Jehuda Sarna. The Fellowship has been called "a new kind of yeshiva and a modern house of study."
- Hillel: The Foundation for Jewish Campus Life, which is the largest Jewish campus organization in the world, engaging Jewish students globally in religious, cultural, artistic, and community-service activities. Hillel's mission is "to enrich the lives of Jewish undergraduate and graduate students so that they may enrich the Jewish people and the world".
- MyJewishLearning.com, which is the leading transdenominational website of Jewish information and education, offering articles and resources on all aspects of Judaism and Jewish life, along with Kveller, a Jewish parenting website that is a project of MyJewishLearning.com.

In April 2012, Bronfman joined the Bill & Melinda Gates Foundation Giving Pledge, a long-term charitable initiative that aims to inspire conversations about philanthropy and increase charitable giving in the United States. Bronfman and 12 others joined the 68 billionaires who had already signed the giving pledge.

Following his death in 2013, Jewish news outlets called Bronfman a "prince of his people," for his unique combination of lineage, intrigue, and devotion to the Jewish people through learning and philanthropy. Through his Jewish philanthropy, Bronfman became known for his unique approach to Jewish life. A proud Jew who publicly stated his disbelief in God, Bronfman developed his own understanding of Judaism, as he learned Jewish texts and traditions both in his personal life and in his work at The Samuel Bronfman Foundation. In an article, journalist Ami Eden writes about Bronfman, who chose to incorporate meaningful Jewish traditions into his life, all the while continuing to educate himself about the religion until his final days. Bronfman also promoted the idea that Jewish organizations needed to stop using fear as a selling point, but rather encourage ordinary Jews to take a deeper interest in the substantive heritage they have been born into. Specifically, while much of the American Jewish community saw intermarriage as an epidemic to be curbed, Bronfman considered the trend an opportunity for Jews to learn further with their non-Jewish partners.

== Awards ==
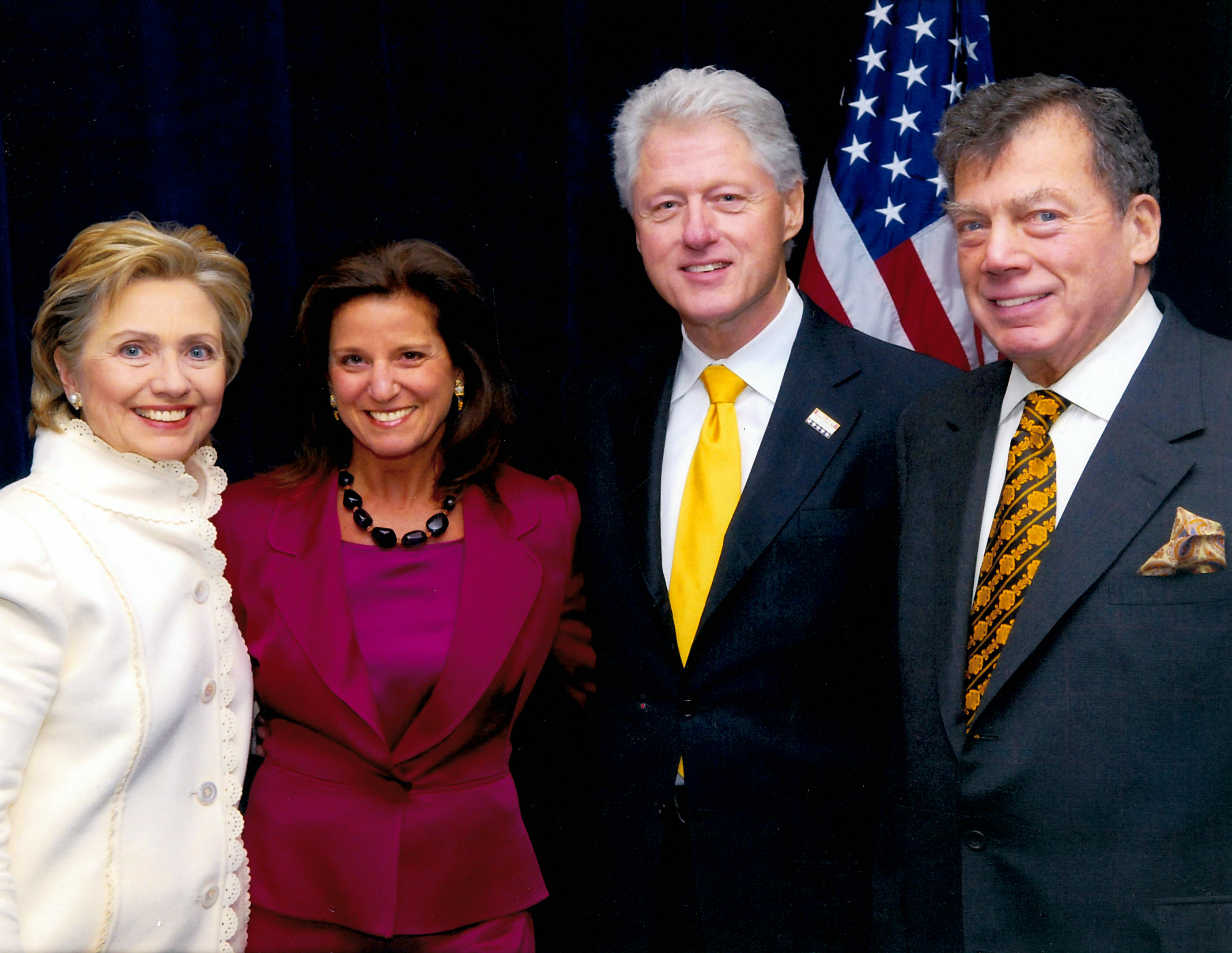
Bronfman received the Presidential Medal of Freedom from President Bill Clinton in 1999.

In 1986 Bronfman was honored with the Chevalier de la Légion d'honneur (Legion of Honour), from the Government of France. He was honored with the Star of People's Friendship by East German leader Erich Honecker in 1988. Bronfman was awarded the Presidential Medal of Freedom by U.S. president Bill Clinton in 1999.

In 2000, he received the Leo Baeck Medal for his humanitarian work promoting tolerance and social justice. In 2005 he received the Hillel Renaissance Award from Hillel International.

== Works or publications ==
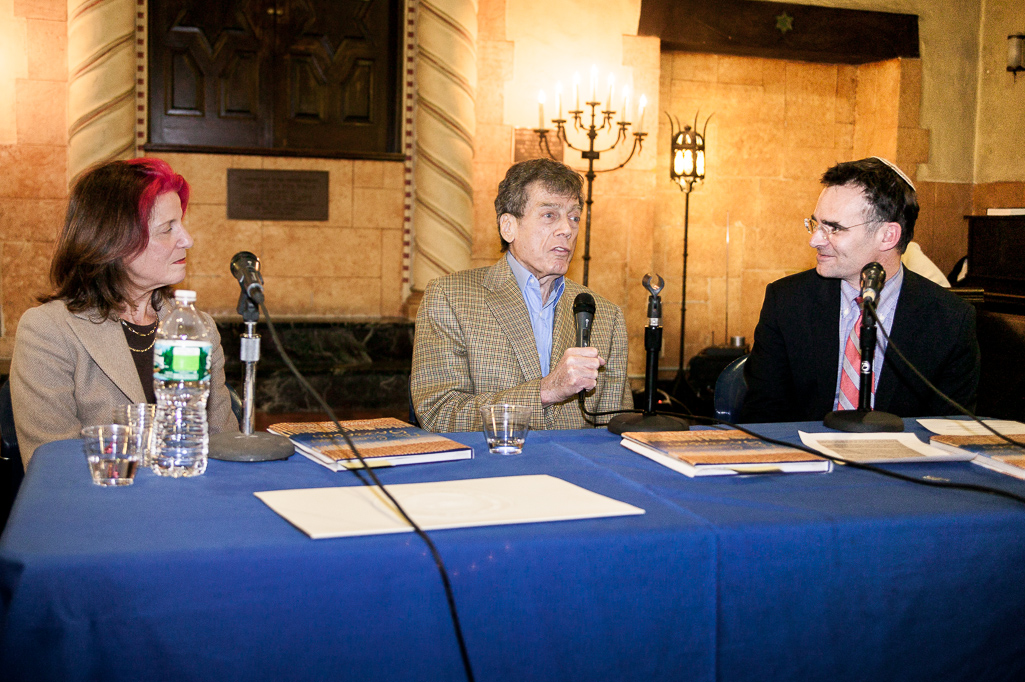
Bronfman, Jan Aronson (left), and Rabbi Andy Bachman (far right) speak about The Bronfman Haggadah

- Bronfman, Edgar M., and Jan Aronson. The Bronfman Haggadah. New York: Rizzoli International Publications, 2012. ISBN 978-0-8478-3968-1.
- Bronfman, Edgar M., and Beth Zasloff. Hope, Not Fear: A Path to Jewish Renaissance. New York: St. Martin's Press, 2008. ISBN 978-0-3123-7792-2.
- Bronfman, Edgar M., and Catherine Whitney. The Third Act: Reinventing Yourself After Retirement. New York: G. P. Putnam, 2002. ISBN 978-0-399-14869-9.
- Bronfman, Edgar M. Good Spirits: The Making of a Businessman. New York: Putnam, 1998. ISBN 978-0-399-14374-8.
- Bronfman, Edgar M. The Making of a Jew. New York: Putnam, 1996. ISBN 978-0-399-14220-8.
