= Samuel Bronfman =

Canadian businessman (1891–1971)

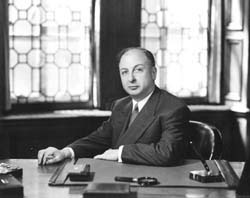
- Bronfman in 1936
- Born: February 27, 1889; Otaci, Soroksky Uyezd, Bessarabia Governorate, Russian Empire
- Died: July 10, 1971 (aged 82); Montreal, Quebec, Canada
- Occupation: Founder of Distillers Corporation Ltd.
- Spouse: Saidye Rosner Bronfman (m. 1922)
- Children: 4

Samuel Bronfman, CC (February 27, 1889 – July 10, 1971) was a Canadian businessman, philanthropist, and member of the Canadian Bronfman family. He founded Distillers Corporation Limited and purchased the Seagram Company, that became the world’s largest liquor distilling firm.

== Biography ==
Samuel Bronfman was born onboard ship en route to Canada, either in Soroki or in Otaci, Soroca uyezd, Bessarabia (then part of the Russian Empire; now part of present-day Moldova), one of eight children of Mindel and Yechiel Bronfman. He and his parents were Jewish refugees of Czarist Russia's antisemitic pogroms, who immigrated to Wapella in Saskatchewan' District of Assiniboia. They soon moved to Brandon, Manitoba. A wealthy family, they were accompanied by their rabbi and two servants. Soon Yechiel learned that tobacco farming, which had made him a wealthy man in his homeland, was incompatible with the cold climate of that region. Yechiel was forced to work as a laborer for the Canadian Northern Railway, and after a short time moved to a better job in a sawmill. Yechiel and his sons then started making a good living selling firewood and began a trade in frozen whitefish to earn a winter income. Eventually, they turned to trade horses, a venture through which they became involved in the hotel and bar business.

In 1903, the family bought a hotel business, and Samuel, noting that much of the profit was in alcoholic beverages, set up shop as a liquor distributor. He founded the Distillers Corporation in Montreal in 1924, specializing in cheap whisky, and concurrently taking advantage of the U.S. prohibition on alcoholic beverages. The Bronfmans sold liquor to the northern cities of the U.S. such as Boston, New York City and Chicago during the Prohibition era, where alcohol production and distribution was illegal, while operating from the perimeters of Montreal, Quebec where alcohol production was legal.

On June 21, 1922, Bronfman married Saidye Rosner (December 9, 1896 – July 6, 1995), with whom he had four children: Aileen Mindel "Minda" Bronfman de Gunzburg (1925–1985), Phyllis Lambert (born January 24, 1927), Edgar Miles Bronfman (June 20, 1929 – December 21, 2013), Charles Rosner Bronfman (born June 27, 1931).

== Business career ==
Bronfman's Distillers Corporation acquired Joseph E. Seagram & Sons of Waterloo, Ontario, from the heirs of Joseph Seagram in 1928. Bronfman eventually built an empire based on the appeal of brand names developed previously by Seagram, including Calvert, Dewars, and Seven Crown—to higher-level consumers. His sales were boosted during the United States' abortive experiment with prohibition, and he was apparently able to do so while staying within the confines of both Canadian law, where prohibition laws had been previously repealed, and American law. His renamed company, Seagram Co. Ltd., became an international distributor of alcoholic beverages, and a diversified conglomerate which included an entertainment branch. Under his leadership, in the 1950s the Seagram company developed a headquarters in New York City, the Seagram Building.

Because of changes to US tax law in the Lyndon Johnson administration, it became advantageous for Bronfman to purchase an oil company, which he did with the purchase of Texas Pacific Coal and Oil Company in 1963 for $50 million. In 1980, the Bronfman heirs sold the Texas Pacific Oil holdings to Sun Oil Co. for $2.3 billion.

The Seagram assets have since been acquired by other companies, notably The Coca-Cola Company, Diageo, and Pernod Ricard.

== Philanthropy, awards and commemoration ==
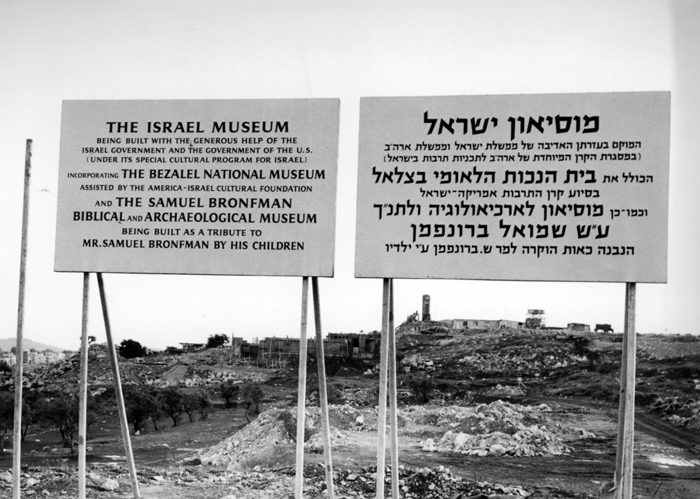
The Bronfman Archaeology Wing of the Israel Museum in Jerusalem, Israel, is named for Bronfman and his wife

In 1952, he established The Samuel and Saidye Bronfman Family Foundation, one of Canada's major private granting foundations. Bronfman was President of the Canadian Jewish Congress from 1939 to 1962, and he was made a Companion of the Order of Canada in 1967. In 1971, he helped to establish the Bronfman Building at McGill University, which houses the Desautels Faculty of Management. The building was named in his honour as appreciation for his donation to the university. The Bronfman family has continued its support of the university; in 1993 they created the McGill Institute for the Study of Canada, and in 2002 donated the Seagram Building on Sherbrooke St. to McGill.

The Bronfman Archaeology Wing of the Israel Museum in Jerusalem, Israel, is named for Bronfman and his wife.

The Samuel Bronfman Chair in Management was also established at McGill University in January 1942. The current holder is Nancy J. Adler, a professor of organizational behavior in the Desautels Faculty of Management.

From 1961 to 1970, the Samuel Bronfman Foundation funded the American Public Health Association's Bronfman Prize for Public Health Achievement and Annual Bronfman Lecture to support public health practitioners that were neglected by existing awards focused on biomedical discoveries. The first awardees were World Health Organization Director-General Marcolino Gomes Candau, National Tuberculosis Association Director James E. Perkins, and National Heart Institute Director James Watt. The first Bronfman lecture was delivered by John C. Bugher, director of the University of Puerto Rico, Río Piedras' Nuclear Center, on his work supporting the US Atomic Energy Commission's biomedical research.

== In fiction ==
Mordecai Richler's 1989 novel Solomon Gursky Was Here is largely based on the life of Samuel Bronfman.

== See also ==
- History of the Jews in Canada
- Moldovan Canadians

Non-profit organization positions
Preceded by Samuel William Jacobs	President of the Canadian Jewish Congress; 1939–1962	Succeeded by Michael Garber
