= List of real estate companies of Canada =

This is an alphabetical list of real estate companies of Canada:

== B ==
- Boardwalk Real Estate Investment Trust
- Brookfield Asset Management

== C ==
- Cadillac Fairview
- Campeau Corporation
- Canada Lands Company
- Carma Developers
- Cemp Investments
- Chartwell Retirement Residences
- ComFree
- Context Development
- Crombie REIT

== F ==
- Fairchild Group

== G ==
- Genstar Development Company

== H ==
- Harvard Developments

== I ==
- InterRent REIT
- Ivanhoé Cambridge

== K ==
- KEYreit
- KRP Properties

== L ==
- Legacy Hotels Real Estate Investment Trust

== M ==
- Macdonald Realty
- Mattamy Homes
- Minto Group

== O ==
- Olympia and York
- Onni Group
- Oxford Properties

== P ==
- Pacific Links International
- PropertyGuys.com

== R ==
- RioCan Real Estate Investment Trust
- Royal LePage
- Royal Trust (Canada)
- Remax

== S ==
- Starlight Investments

== T ==
- Tamarack Developments Corporation
- Temple Hotels
- Tridel
- Triple Five Group
