= Brookfield Corporation =

Canadian asset management company

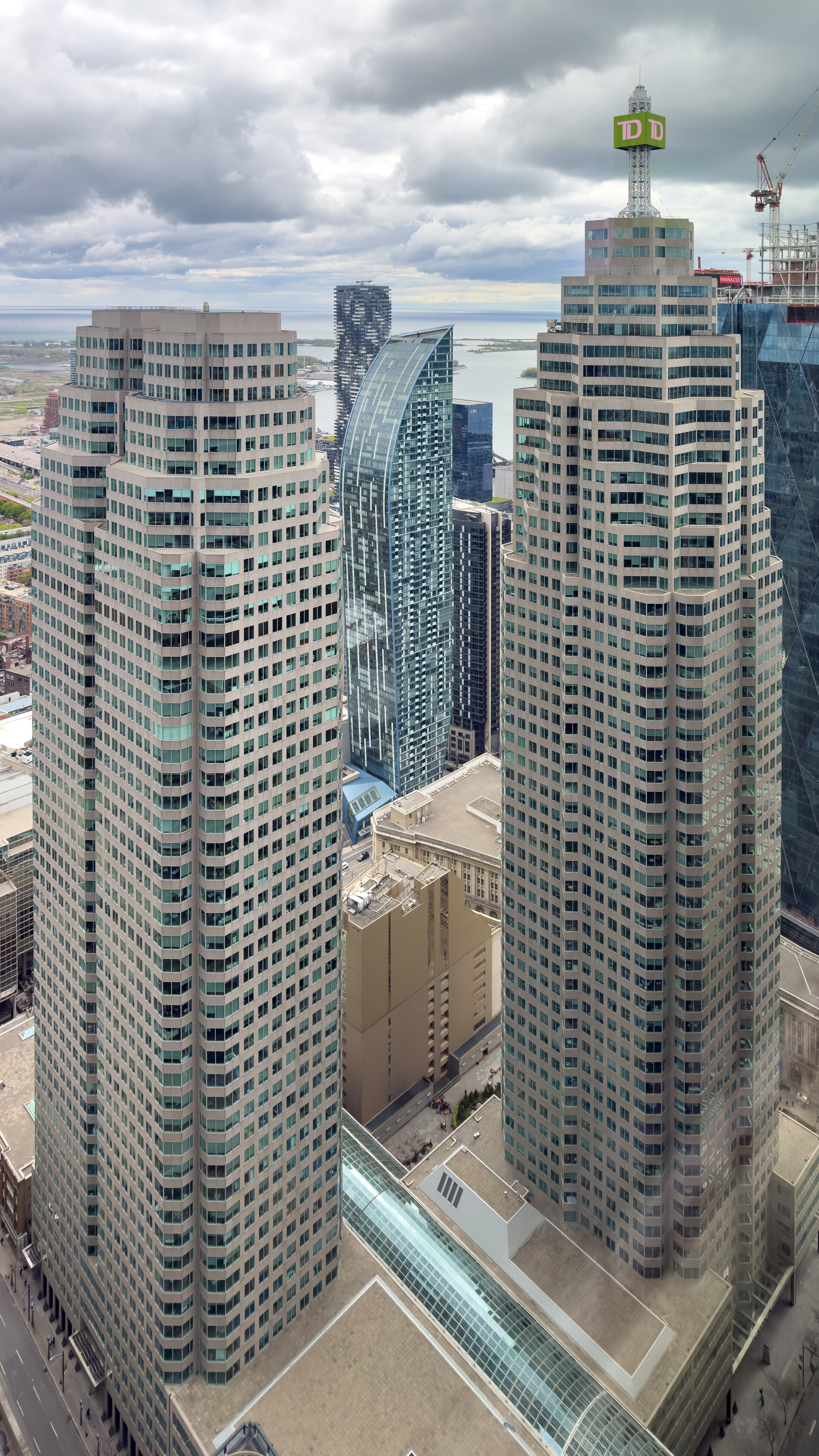
- Headquarters at Brookfield Place
- Formerly: EdperBrascan Corporation (1997–2000); Brascan Corporation (2000–2005); Brookfield Asset Management (2005–2022)
- Type: Public
- Traded as: NYSE: BN; TSX: BN
- Industry: Financial services
- Founded: 1 August 1997; 29 years ago
- Headquarters: Brookfield Place, Toronto, Ontario, Canada
- Area served: Worldwide
- Key people: Frank McKenna (chairman); Bruce Flatt (CEO)
- Services: Asset management
- Revenue: ▼US$75.10 billion (2025)
- Net income: ▲US$3.235 billion (2025)
- AUM: ▲ Over US$1 trillion (2025)
- Total assets: ▲US$519.0 billion (2025)
- Total equity: ▲US$166.2 billion (2025)
- Number of employees: c. 250,000 (2025)
- Subsidiaries: Brookfield Asset Management; Brookfield Business Partners; Brookfield Infrastructure Partners; Brookfield Property Partners; Brookfield Renewable Partners; Brookfield Residential; Oaktree Capital Management
- Website: brookfield.com

Brookfield Corporation is a Canadian multinational company that is one of the world's largest alternative investment management companies. It has over US$1 trillion of assets under management, much of which is workers’ deferred income from global public pension funds. It focuses on direct control investments in real estate, renewable power, infrastructure, credit and private equity. The company invests in distressed securities through Oaktree Capital, which it bought in 2019. Brookfield Corporation's headquarters are in Toronto, while its primary subsidiary, Brookfield Asset Management, relocated to New York City in 2024.

The current Brookfield Corporation is the creation of the 1997 merger of Edper and Brascan. At its inception, the company was known as EdperBrascan, then changed its name to Brascan in 2000, and Brookfield Asset Management in 2005. In December 2022, the company renamed itself Brookfield Corporation (traded as BN) and spun off its asset management business as Brookfield Asset Management (traded as BAM).

In June 2024, Brookfield Asset Management ranked 24th in Private Equity International's PEI 300 ranking among the world's largest private equity firms.

As of 2026, Brookfield Corporation was ranked 224 on the Forbes Global 2000.

== Predecessor companies ==
=== Brascan ===
The company was founded in 1899 as the São Paulo Tramway, Light and Power Company by William Mackenzie and Frederick Stark Pearson. It operated in the construction and management of electricity and transport infrastructure in Brazil.

In 1904, the Rio de Janeiro Tramway, Light and Power Company was founded by Mackenzie's group.

In 1912, Brazilian Traction, Light and Power Company was incorporated in Toronto as a public company to develop hydro-electric power operations and other utility services in Brazil, becoming a holding company for São Paulo Tramway Co. and Rio de Janeiro Tramway Co. In 1916, Great Lakes Power Company was incorporated to provide hydro-electric power in Sault Ste. Marie and the Algoma District in Ontario.

In 1966, Brazilian Traction, Light and Power Company changed its name to Brazilian Light and Power Company, and again in 1969, changed its name to Brascan Limited. Brascan is a portmanteau of “Brasil” and “Canada”.

During the 1970s, the company began to sell its Brazilian interests, and invested more heavily in industries such as real estate, timber and mining.

In 1979, the last of the company's Brazilian assets were transferred to Brazilian ownership (Eletropaulo and Light S.A.), the company meanwhile having diversified to other areas. The company provided electricity and tram services in São Paulo and Rio de Janeiro. After restructuring, the company's Brazilian portfolio operated as Light S.A., short for Brazilian Traction, Light and Power Co. Ltd.

In 1992, Brookfield and Johnson Controls was established through a merger in Canada of Brookfield and Johnson Controls—a building systems and facility management company that was founded in the late 19th century by Warren S. Johnson, whose invention of the first electric room thermostat helped launch the building control industry. By 2012, Brookfield and Johnson Controls became an established industry leader with 11,500 locations across Canada. In 2007, Brookfield Asset Management acquired the Multiplex, an Australian international construction contracting company founded in 1962 by John Roberts. which was valued at that time at approximately A$7.3 billion. It was renamed Brookfield Multiplex in 2016. In 2012 Brookfield Asset Management and Johnson Controls Global WorkPlace Solutions (GWS) merged to create Brookfield Johnson Controls.

=== Edper Investments ===
In 1959, Edper Investments was founded by brothers Peter and Edward Bronfman.

== History of Brookfield ==
In April 1997, the Edper Group Ltd. announced its intention to merge with its subsidiary Brascan Ltd. At the time, Edper owned 47 per cent of Brascan shares. If approved, the merger would create a new $8 billion company. Robert Harding, president of Edper, stated that the intention of the merger was "furthering the simplification initiative that we started in 1993." On 10 July 1997, special meetings of both companies were held, and both groups of shareholders voted in favour of the merger. On 1 August 1997, the new EdperBrascan Corporation came into being as an Ontario corporation (number 1249197).

In 2002, Bruce Flatt was appointed CEO of Brascan.

In June 2005 Noranda, which was 41-percent-owned by Brascan, merged with Falconbridge Nickel Mines, and in August 2005 Brascan decided to sell its mineral holdings, to Xstrata.

In September 2005, after 37 years, Brascan Corp. was renamed to Brookfield Asset Management Inc. Between 2013 and 2018, the company and its subsidiaries invested approximately $10 billion in Brazilian energy, infrastructure and real estate developments, including acquisitions of oil pipelines from energy companies such as Petroleo Brasileiro SA.

In 2015, Brookfield Asset Management became the ultimate parent company of what is now Brookfield Global Integrated Solutions (BGIS), when it acquired control of Brookfield Johnson Controls from its joint venture partner, Milwaukee-based Johnson Controls. At that time, an activist investor had been putting pressure on Johnson Controls to divest of its real estate division. The facilities management business was renamed Brookfield Global Integrated Solutions (BGIS) as part of Brookfield's plan to establish a “leading global facilities management provider”. BGIS expanded rapidly following Brookfield's taking control of BGIS in 2015, In 2016, when BGIS acquired the US-based data centre facility management service—McKinstry FMS—which had over “350 engineers, technicians, planners and program managers”, BGIS became one of the largest facility management companies serving data centres in North America. By 2017, when Gord Hicks was named as Toronto-based BGIS’ CEO, the company had 7,000 staff members and 100 clients in the United States, the United Kingdom, Asia, and Canada, which included contracts with the Canadian federal government. By 2022, according to a Carleton University School of Public Policy and Administration analysis of federal government contracts for real estate management, the Government of Canada spent over $1 billion on contracts with BGIS in 2021–2022, representing the largest vendor contracts at that time. In 2019, Brookfield Asset Management sold its BGIS shares to CCMP Capital Advisors—an American private equity investment firm—for over CAD$1.3 billion with Hicks remaining as CEO. and was awarded the 2020 Private Equity Deal of the Year for the BGIS sale.

By 2018, Brookfield's major public subsidiaries included Brookfield Infrastructure Partners, Brookfield Renewable Partners, Brookfield Property Partners, and Brookfield Business Partners. In August 2018, Brookfield purchased Westinghouse Electric Company, a manufacturer of large nuclear reactors, out of bankruptcy for $4.6 billion.

On March 13, 2019, Brookfield Asset Management announced that it had agreed to buy most of Oaktree Capital Management for about $4.7 billion, creating one of the world's largest alternative money managers. On July 31, 2019, the sale of Vodafone New Zealand Limited to a consortium comprising Infratil Limited and Brookfield Asset Management Inc. was settled.

In a deal in October 2019, Brookfield bought The Leela Palaces, Hotels and Resorts, an Indian luxury hotel chain located in New Delhi, Bengaluru, Chennai, Udaipur, in a US$530 million settlement, marking the entry of Brookfield in India's hospitality market.

In 2020, in response to the COVID-19 pandemic, Brookfield's CEO Bruce Flatt assessed that the economic fallout was “much more manageable” than previous meltdowns.

In October 2020, Mark Carney, departing Governor of the Bank of England and future Prime Minister of Canada, became a vice-chair of Brookfield, leading the firm's environmental, social and governance (ESG) and impact fund investment strategy.

In November 2020, there were reports that Brookfield might partner with Rogers Communications to introduce condominiums to the site of the Rogers Centre baseball stadium, home of the Toronto Blue Jays of Major League Baseball, reducing the amount of space available for sport, but the partnership never transpired.

On April 25, 2022, it was announced the Brookfield and Simon Property Group were set to offer to buy Kohl's.

In November 2022, the Canada Pension Plan Investment Board (CPPIB) bought Brookfield's portfolio of Indian road assets for $1.2 billion.

In August 2022, Intel signed a $30 billion partnership with Brookfield to fund its recent factory expansions. As part of the deal, Intel would have a controlling stake by funding 51 percent of the cost of building new chip-making facilities in Chandler, Arizona, with Brookfield owning the remaining 49 percent stake, allowing the companies to split the revenue from those facilities.

On December 9, 2022, the company's name was changed from Brookfield Asset Management Inc. to Brookfield Corporation. Brookfield Corporation then spun-off 25% interest in their asset management business into the new publicly listed Brookfield Asset Management Ltd.

In April 2023, it was reported by Bloomberg that Brookfield Corporation had defaulted on $161.4 million worth of office building mortgages, mostly in the Washington D.C. area, due to high office vacancy and interest rates. Two months before, Brookfield defaulted on $784 million in mortgages for two Los Angeles office towers. It was suggested the defaults were a strategy to renegotiate commercial mortgages.

In November 2024, Brookfield committed an additional £900 million to support Canary Wharf Group months after its credit rating was cut to “junk” status. The value of CWG's office portfolio plunged by £1.5 billion to £4.27 billion after the COVID-19 pandemic caused a loss of tenants. Brookfield and Qatar Investment Authority had minority stakes in CWG until 2015 when the partners acquired 100% for an additional £2.6 billion.

Brookfield stated it was shifting towards residential properties and disposed of more than $10 billion of commercial properties from 2020 to 2022. In December 2024, Brookfield bought US student-housing communities for $893 million, eyeing communities that had growing student enrollment and limited supply. Brookfield also purchased, or was negotiating a $5 billion deal to obtain North American residential assets.

In January 2025, according to The Globe and Mail, it was announced that Brookfield had bought out its partners, CPPIB and Alberta Investment Management Corporation (AIMCo), in the Maritime Life Building in Toronto, which had been on the market for over two years without receiving a suitable offer.

In July 2025, Brookfield Wealth Solutions agreed to acquire Just Group, a UK-based financial services company, for $3.18 billion. The deal was part of Brookfield's planned expansion into the UK pension risk market.

In February 2026, Brookfield announced the promotion of Connor Teskey to Chief Executive of its asset management arm, as part of its broader succession planning for long-term Chief Executive Bruce Flatt.

== Controversies ==
=== Bribery ===
In 2013, a Brazilian prosecutor filed charges against the company's local division, alleging the company paid bribes to local officials, which is also a violation of U.S. federal criminal law. The bribes were allegedly used to pave the way for Brookfield to build a shopping center in São Paulo. The U.S. Securities and Exchange Commission also opened a formal investigation into the company about the bribery charges. The company denied the charges. The U.S. Department of Justice also opened a criminal investigation into the company regarding these allegations, and did not end up making any arrests. According to the Stanford Law School Foreign Corrupt Practices Act Clearinghouse, which studied the case, the investigation and filing of charges was initiated by a whistleblower and anonymous tip. Later it was revealed that the whistleblower was the former CFO of a Brookfield subsidiary. She claims she was fired for refusing to participate in Brookfield's bribery scheme. The company disclosed the investigations on several 6-K forms between 2013 and 2015.

=== Circular cash flows ===
A March 2024 article in the Financial Times criticized Brookfield for its complex structure and its circular flows of cash after buying and selling multiple properties to itself at high, pre-pandemic valuations. These transactions were said to mask a $2 billion loss in its commercial real estate portfolio while boosting Brookfield's “distributable earnings,” a metric that the Financial Times called non-standard. Brookfield replied that there is nothing deceptive in its financial reporting and that the newspaper “willfully mischaracterized” its business.

== Civil lawsuits and public reactions ==
In September 2010, a group called Birch Mountain Shareholders for Justice filed a lawsuit with the Ontario Superior Court of Justice against Brookfield Asset Management, challenging an acquisition and transfer of assets. Birch Mountain had run into financial troubles and accused Brookfield of financial engineering that resulted in Brookfield acquiring the company's $1.6 billion limestone quarry for $50 million. According to Birch Mountain, Brookfield had made use of death spiral financing and insider trading. After five years of litigation the case was dismissed, based on the fact that Birch Mountain had failed to present credible evidence. In May 2015, the plaintiffs filed a notice of appeal, but their case was likewise dismissed two years later.

In 2009, Brookfield sued financial and insurance giant American International Group (AIG) in a Manhattan federal court, alleging that AIG's collapse caused default provisions in interest-rate swaps. The suit stemmed from AIG's acceptance of a $182.3 billion bailout package from the federal government, which Brookfield argued overturned AIG's bankruptcy protection. The insurance firm countersued, claiming that Brookfield was trying to get out of its $1.5 billion debt to AIG. The litigation ended with Brookfield paying $905 million to settle the lawsuit.

In March 2013, the Southern Investigative Reporting Foundation called into question Brookfield's makeup. The analysis written by Roddy Boyd accused the company of using a pyramidal control structure, alleging that a small group of shareholders hold outsized power and may easily use the capital of other investors without risking their own.

In August 2018, Brookfield signed a 99-year lease on the financially troubled 666 Fifth Avenue (later renamed 660 Fifth Avenue) skyscraper in New York City, of Donald Trump's son-in-law Jared Kushner. The deal raised suspicions that the Qatar Investment Authority, a major investor in Brookfield, was attempting to influence the first Trump administration.

== Finances ==
For the fiscal year 2018, Brookfield Asset Management reported earnings of US$3.584 billion, with an annual revenue of $56.771 billion, an increase of 39.2% over the previous fiscal cycle. Brookfield Asset Management's shares traded at over $38 per share, and its market capitalization was valued at over $40.8 billion in November 2018.

== Leadership ==
=== Chief Executive Officer ===
1. Jack Lynn Cockwell, 1 August 1997 – February 2002
2. James Bruce Flatt, February 2002 – present

=== President ===
1. Jack Lynn Cockwell, 1 August 1997 – February 2002
2. James Bruce Flatt, February 2002 – 2005
3. Nicholas Howard Goodman, 12 December 2022 – present

=== Chairman of the Board ===
1. Robert James Harding, 1 August 1997 – 5 August 2010
2. Francis Joseph McKenna, 5 August 2010 – present

== See also ==
- Edper Investments, the Bronfman holding company that controlled Brascan from 1979 to 1993
- List of real estate companies of Canada
