= Jack Cockwell =

Canadian businessman (born 1941)

- Born: 12 January 1941 (age 85); East London, South Africa
- Education: Selborne College ('58); University of Cape Town (BCom '64, MCom '66)
- Spouse(s): Unknown (m. 1966) Norma Gail Harding Wendy Marion Cecil (m. 1987) Lynda Hamilton (m. 2001)

Jack Lynn Cockwell CM (born 12 January 1941) is a South African-Canadian accountant and financier. Cockwell joined Touche Ross in Cape Town in 1960 as a clerk while studying at the University of Cape Town. In 1966, the firm sent Cockwell to Montreal for a six-month placement, during which time he decided to remain in Canada. In 1968, Cockwell was recruited by the Bronfman family to work for Edper Investments. Upon Edper's acquisition of Brascan in 1979, Cockwell joined Brascan as senior vice-president for planning, and in 1981 became executive vice-president. Cockwell succeeded Trevor Eyton as president of the company in 1991. In 1997, Cockwell orchestrated the merger of Edper and Brascan to form Brookfield Corporation. He retired as president and chief executive officer of Brookfield in February 2002, though he remains a director. Cockwell is a shareholder of Partners Ltd, a private company consisting of a small group of former Edper managers that owns a majority voting share of Brookfield. According to Forbes, Cockwell is worth around $3 billion, making him the 1,219th richest person in the world.

== Biography ==
Jack Lynn Cockwell was born in East London, South Africa on 12 January 1941 to William Henry Cockwell (1910–1979) and Daphne Cound Lynn (1915–2008). His father's family was of English origin and had moved to Cape Colony around 1820, while his mother's family was of Scottish origin. He has an older sister, Lynnette, and two younger brothers, Peter and Ian. In his youth, Cockwell was an accomplished Scout and represented his troupe at the 9th World Scout Jamboree in England in 1957. Cockwell attended Selborne College, where he graduated in 1958. In 1960, the Cockwell family moved to Cape Town. That year, Cockwell joined Touche Ross as a clerk and intern, began a degree at the University of Cape Town, and signed to play for the Villager Football Club. Cockwell worked full time as an accountant trainee and took night classes. He graduated Bachelor of Commerce in 1964 and thereafter began postgraduate studies. In 1966, he graduated Master of Commerce and wrote his thesis on the South African deciduous fruit marketing board.

In 1966, Touche Ross sent Cockwell to Montreal for a six-month placement. During his time with the accounting firm in Montreal, Cockwell was mentored by Donald Wells, who assigned him to audit Canadian National Railways. Cockwell made significant changes to the process by which the company was audited, and received acclaim for his work.

At some point in the mid-1960s, Touche Ross partner Howard Irwin Ross was fundraising for McGill University and met with Peter Bronfman and Neil Baker of Edper in search of money. The meeting led to a working relationship between the two companies, and Cockwell was assigned to audit Edper. In 1968, Edper offered Cockwell a job, which Cockwell accepted while he was in South Africa for the Christmas holidays.

Cockwell has been married four times. In 1966 he married his first wife, who had come with him from South Africa to Canada. The marriage ended in divorce. He married secondly to Norma Gail Harding, a Montreal native who was Paul Lowenstein's secretary at Edper. They divorced in the mid 1980s. During his divorce from Norma, Cockwell began dating Wendy Marion Cecil, who was a vice-president at Edper. In August 1986 they had a daughter together, then married in 1987, and later had two sons. Both of Cockwell's sons, Malcolm and Gareth, work in the forestry industry. Cockwell and Cecil divorced in 2000. From 2010 to 2017, Cecil served as chancellor of Victoria University. In 2001, Cockwell married Lynda Hamilton, the third wife and widow of Peter Bronfman.

In the mid-1980s, Cockwell bought 2,300 acres of property near Huntsville that once housed the Limberlost Lodge. Cockwell used the land to create the Limberlost Forest and Wildlife Reserve, which is now over 10,000 acres and is accessible to the public. In 2011, Cockwell donated $10 million to George Brown College to build Limberlost Place, a 10-storey timber building designed by Moriyama & Teshima and Acton Ostry Architects.

Cockwell has had a longstanding philanthropic relationship with Toronto Metropolitan University (formerly Ryerson University) and has been a long-time member of its board of governors. In 2008, he donated $5 million to the university's nursing school, which was renamed the Daphne Cockwell School of Nursing, in honour of his mother.
