= Connor Teskey =

Canadian financier (born 1987)

- Born: 8 October 1987 (age 39); Vancouver, British Columbia, Canada
- Education: St George's School ('05); University of Western Ontario (HBA '09)
- Occupations: Financier, business executive
- Known for: Chief executive officer of Brookfield Asset Management.

Connor David Teskey (born 8 October 1987) is a Canadian financier who, since February 2026, has been the chief executive officer of Brookfield Asset Management.

Teskey began his career in 2009 with the Canadian Imperial Bank of Commerce, and in 2012 joined Brookfield Corporation. He worked initially in asset management and in 2016 moved to Brookfield Renewable Partners, of which he became chief executive officer in 2020. In 2022, Teskey was made president of the new Brookfield Asset Management, which had been created as a spin-off. In 2026, he became chief executive of Brookfield Asset Management, and is the presumed successor of Bruce Flatt as chief executive of Brookfield Corporation.

== Early life and education ==
Connor Teskey was born on 8 October 1987 in Vancouver to Kenneth G. Teskey and Cindy Teskey. The name Teskey likely is of Polish origin, and the family was part of a cohort from the Palatinate who migrated to County Limerick in the late 17th century. The family came to Canada in the early 19th century and settled initially in Quebec, then later in Ontario. The Teskeys were pioneers in Southern Alberta. The family came to Alberta in 1903 and lived first in Claresholm before settling in Carmangay. Connor Teskey's grandfather, Albert, moved to Vancouver with his work for the Meteorological Service of Canada. Albert's son, Kenneth, graduated Bachelor of Laws from the University of British Columbia in 1977. Kenneth served as secretary and chief risk officer of MCAP Financial Corporation.

Connor attended St George's School in Vancouver. At the school, he joined the rowing team and became a coxswain. Teskey competed in the 2004 and 2005 World Rowing Junior Championships held respectively in Banyoles, Spain and Brandenburg an der Havel, Germany. In the 2004 event, Teskey coxed Canada's eight, which finished fourth (last) in its heat and fourth (last) in the repechage. In 2005, Teskey coxed Canada's coxed four, which advanced to the finals where it finished fifth.

Teskey attended the Ivey Business School at the University of Western Ontario, where he graduated Honours Business Administration in 2009.

== Career ==
Teskey began his career in 2009 with the Canadian Imperial Bank of Commerce in corporate debt origination. He remained with the bank for three years.

In 2012 he joined Brookfield in its private equity group. In 2016, he moved to London, England to join Brookfield Renewable Partners. In October 2020, Teskey succeeded Sachin Shah as chief executive officer of Brookfield Renewable. Teskey took over Brookfield Renewable shortly after Mark Carney joined Brookfield as vice-chairman and head of transition investing. When Brookfield chief executive Bruce Flatt recruited Carney to the company, part of the pitch Flatt made was the opportunity to work with Teskey. Flatt said, "we have this fantastic person, really first-class manager, developer of people."

At the same time Teskey became chief executive of Brookfield Renewable, Carney was made vice-chairman of this company as well. For the next three years, Teskey worked closely with Carney to develop the company's renewables investments strategy and to launch Global Transition Fund, which the two men managed jointly. In his book Values: Building a Better World for All, Carney credits Teskey for having helped develop his thinking on climate action.

In December 2022, Brookfield spun-off its asset management business in a new company that would use the name Brookfield Asset Management (BAM), while the existing Brookfield would continue as Brookfield Corporation (BN). Upon the formation of the new company, Teskey was made president, Bruce Flatt chief executive, and Mark Carney chairman of the board.

In 2024, Flatt announced to shareholders that Teskey had been tapped as his successor as chief executive of Brookfield Asset Management. On 3 February 2026, Teskey succeeded Flatt as chief executive officer of Brookfield Asset Management, while Flatt remained chairman of the board. The move precedes the likely appointment of Teskey as chief executive of Brookfield Corporation, the parent company.
