= Brascan =

Canadian corporation (1912–1997)

- Formerly: Brazilian Traction, Light and Power Company, Limited (1912–1966); Brazilian Light and Power Company Limited (1966–1969)
- Industry: Public utility Conglomerate
- Founded: 12 July 1912
- Defunct: 1 August 1997
- Fate: Merged with Edper Investments
- Successor: Brookfield Corporation
- Headquarters: Toronto, Ontario

Brascan Limited was a Canadian utility and, later, conglomerate, that existed from 1912 to 1997. The company was founded as the Brazilian Traction, Light and Power Company, Limited as a holding company for Canadian-owned tramways in Rio de Janeiro and São Paulo. Over time its operations expanded beyond transportation to include hydroelectricity, gas distribution, and telephone services. Brazilian Traction grew to become effectively a Canadian empire in Brazil run from its headquarters in Toronto. At its pinnacle in the late 1940s, BTL&P employed around half a million people in Brazil and was Canada's second largest non-financial corporation behind only the Canadian Pacific Railway, with assets of approximately $400 million.

Brazilian Traction continued to operate in the country following the establishment of a military dictatorship in 1964. In 1966 it changed its name to the Brazilian Light and Power Company Limited, and in 1969 to Brascan, reflecting the beginning of its investments in Canada. In 1979, the company was forced by the dictatorship to sell its main asset, Light S.A., to the country's national utility, Eletrobras. Consequently, Brascan became mostly devoid of assets but had an abundance of cash.

Beginning in 1978, the Bronfman family began to acquire shares of Brascan, and the following year acquired effective control. At the time, the main investment vehicle of the family was Edper Investments. The Bronfmans used the stockpile of cash Brascan had acquired from the sale of its Brazilian assets to go on an acquisitions spree, turning the company into a corporate conglomerate. During the 1980s, Brascan acquired a range of major Canadian companies including Noranda Mines, Falconbridge Mines, Norcen Energy, and London Life. Following the restructuring of Edper in 1993, in 1997, Edper and Brascan merged into a new company called EdperBrascan. In 2000, the company changed its name to Brascan, and then in 2005 to Brookfield, which it remains today.

== History ==
Brazilian Traction was one of a number of Canadian utility companies that operated exclusively abroad. Others in this group included the Mexico Tramways Company (and its subsidiary the Mexican Light and Power Company), Barcelona Traction, Light and Power Company, Jamaica Public Service, Trinidad Electric Company, Northern Mexico Power and Development Company, and International Power Company.

On 2 August 1928, Sir Alexander Mackenzie stepped down from the presidency owing to ill health. He had been appointed president in 1915, having previously served as vice-president of the predecessor companies since 1904. The board appointed as Mackenzie's replacement William Miller Lash (1873–1941), who had been Sir Alexander's recommendation. Lash, not to be confused with his cousin William Lash Miller, was a prominent lawyer in Toronto and was the eldest son of Zebulon Aiton Lash.

President Lash died at home in Toronto on 8 October 1941 at age 69. Later that month, the board appointed Sir Herbert Henry Couzens (1877–1944) as Lash's successor as president.

Sir Herbert died in England on 17 November 1944. Six days later, the board appointed Asa White Kenney Billings (1976–1949) as his successor.

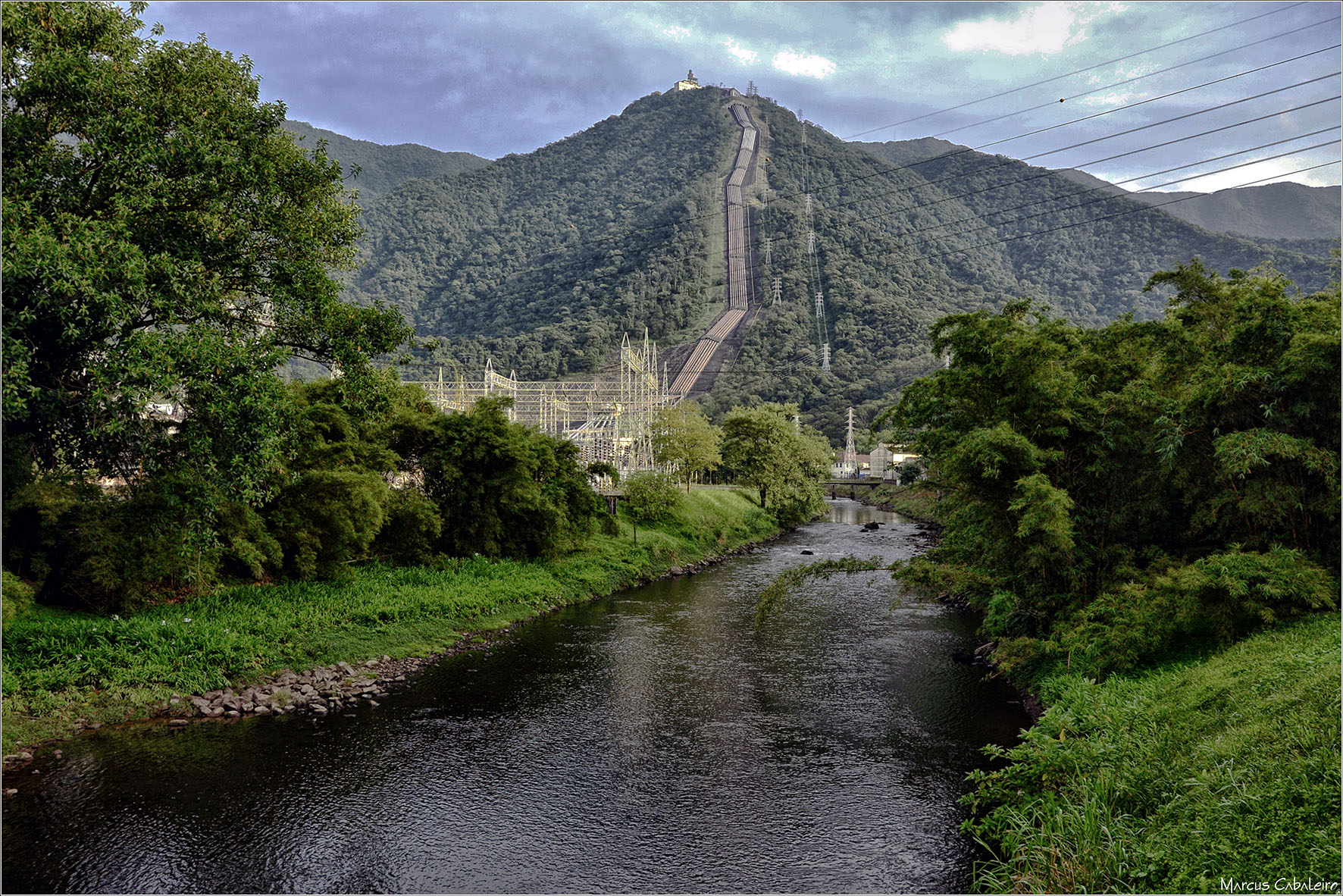
The Henry Borden plant was constructed in 1925 and supplies power to São Paulo

At the company's annual meeting on 27 June 1946, Billings stepped down from the presidency due to poor health and was replaced by Henry Borden (1901–1989). Additionally, the office of chairman of the board, which had been vacant since Sir William's death in 1923, was revived for Colonel Walter Gow (1872–1959), who was a cousin of John McCrae.

In September 1963, after 17 years in the presidency, Borden stepped down and was replaced by John Grant Glassco (1905–1968). Concurrently, Borden was appointed chairman. Borden remained in the chair until January 1965, when he asked the board to be relieved of his duties, but continued as a director. Borden remained a director until December 1975, when he reached the mandatory retirement age.

The company sold its Rio trams in 1963. By 1965, the company had a backlog of 800,000 telephone orders and estimated and estimated that it would cost $450 million to fix the situation. In March 1966, BTL&P sold the Companhia Telefônica Brasileira to Embratel for US $96 million.

At the company's annual meeting on 21 June 1966, which counted as a special meeting also, shareholders voted to remove "Traction" from the company's name and became the Brazilian Light and Power Company Limited. President Glassco stated, "we have now totally withdrawn from both the traction and telephone fields and our business is overwhelmingly that of the generation and distribution of electrical energy. In these circumstances, the proposed name 'Brazilian Light and Power Company Limited' seems to be appropriate." The change was approved, and on 4 July 1966, the new name came into effect.

Brazilian Light used the profits from the sale of its tram and telephone operations to make its first domestic investment. In April 1967, the company partnered with Investors Group of Winnipeg and Jonlab Investments of London to acquire the 39 per cent holding of John Labatt Limited owned by the Joseph Schlitz Brewing Company. Brazilian took one million shares, 300,000 went to Investors, and 400,000 went to Jonlab.

On 4 May 1968 at a board meeting held in Rio de Janeiro, Glassco was elected chairman of the board, and Robert Henry Winters (1910–1969) was appointed president, the latter to assume his duties on 1 June. Winters's appointment as president marked his return to business after a long stint as a member of parliament and after coming in second to Pierre Trudeau in the 1968 Liberal Party of Canada leadership election that April. Glassco was chairman for only four months, and died in September 1968.

At the 1969 annual meeting held on 4 June 1969, shareholders voted to approve a company name change. After the vote passed, on 23 June 1969, Brazilian Light and Power changed its name to Brascan Limited.

On 12 September 1969, Winters was elected chairman of the board and was succeeded as president by John Henderson "Jake" Moore (1915–1997). Moore was at the time the president of John Labatt. Winters served as chairman for less than a month before his death on 10 October 1969 at age 59.

On 1 March 1976, Edward Carson Freeman-Attwood (1930–2022) succeeded Moore as president, while Moore moved to the office of chairman of the board, which had been vacant since Winters's death in 1969. The new president was the son of British Army general Harold Freeman-Attwood, and had been working in Brazil since 1964 as a managing partner for Arthur Young & Co. and Clarkson Gordon & Co. In 1971 he joined Brascan as an assistant vice-president, finance, and in 1973 was promoted to vice-president, finance.

=== Edper years, 1979–1997 ===
In December 1978, Brascan announced that it would sell its sole remaining property, its 83 per cent stake in Light S.A. to Eletrobras for US $380 million, which was $460 million below book value. The sale closed on 12 January 1979, and brought to an end officially the company's operations in Brazil.

Following the sale in January, on 9 April, Brascan made a $1.2 billion bid to acquire a majority stake in F. W. Woolworth Company, the American department store. The decision contradicted the message it had given to shareholders in early 1979 after the Light sale, which is that it would use the cash to make medium size, diverse investments. If successful, the acquisition would give Brascan one major holding and around $800 million in debt. On 19 January, Edper Equities, owning five per cent of Brascan and which was two-thirds owned by Edper Investments, made a bid to acquire 45 per cent of Brascan for $28 per share, on the condition that Brascan abandon its Woolworth takeover. The bid would remain open for 120 days. However, the bid was blocked by the Ontario Securities Commission the following day. On 1 May, Edper began buying large blocks of Brascan shares on the American Stock Exchange at an average price of US $22.50, and ended up acquiring around 33 per cent of the company. Brascan attempted to obtain an injunction against Edper in New York, but this was turned down. On 30 May, Edper took control of Brascan and ended the takeover bid of Woolworth. By June, Edper had increased its holdings in Brascan to just under 50 per cent through purchases on Canadian exchanges.

In June of 1979, Moore indicated that he would resign as chairman at the annual meeting on 29 June, along with three other directors. However, Moore tendered his resignation four days early, bringing an end to his long stint at the helm of the company. At the annual meeting, Peter Bronfman was elected as the new chairman and assumed the duties of chief executive officer. That September, John Trevor Eyton (1934–2019) replaced Freeman-Attwood as president. Freeman-Attwood remained with the company as vice-president, Brazil.

The final top executive change came at the company's annual meeting on 8 May 1991, when Eyton succeeded Bronfman as chairman of the board while Jack Lynn Cockwell (1941–) became president.

=== Merger with Edper and creation of Brookfield, 1997 ===
In April 1997, Edper announced its plan to merge with Brascan, of which it owned 47 per cent of outstanding shares. Upon the merger, Partners Ltd., a company controlled by 26 senior officials, would own two thirds of the new company's privately held class-B shares, and 10 per cent of the publicly traded class-B shares. Each share class would have the rights to elect half the board of directors, therefore, Partners would hold majority control of the board. In effect, the merger would grant indefinite control of the new company to its management.

On 10 July 1997, Brascan shareholders voted to merge with the Edper Group to form a new company, EdperBrascan Corporation, traded as EBC, with a market capitalisation of almost $4 billion. The new company came into existence on 1 August 1997, bringing an end to Brascan after an 85-year life.

On 28 April 2000, EdperBrascan changed its name to Brascan Corporation, trade as BNN. On 10 November 2005, Brascan changed its name to Brookfield Asset Management Inc., traded under the symbol BAM. In December 2022, the company changed its name to Brookfield Corporation, and spun off its asset management operations as Brookfield Asset Management.

== Leadership ==
=== President ===
1. Frederick Stark Pearson, 12 July 1912 – 7 May 1915 †
2. Sir Alexander Mackenzie, 15 May 1915 – 2 August 1928
3. William Miller Lash, 2 August 1928 – 8 October 1941 †
4. Sir Herbert Henry Couzens, 27 October 1941– 17 November 1944 †
5. Asa White Kenney Billings, 23 November 1944 – 27 June 1946
6. Henry Borden, 27 June 1946 – September 1963
7. John Grant Glassco, September 1963 – 4 May 1968
8. Robert Henry Winters, 1 June 1968 – 12 September 1969
9. John Henderson Moore, 12 September 1969 – 1 March 1976
10. Edward Carson Freeman-Attwood, 1 March 1976 – 13 September 1979
11. John Trevor Eyton, 13 September 1979 – 8 May 1991
12. Jack Lynn Cockwell, 8 May 1991 – 1 August 1997

=== Chairman of the Board ===
1. Sir William Mackenzie, 12 July 1912 – 5 December 1923 †
2. Col. Walter Gow, 23 November 1944 – 27 June 1946
3. Henry Borden, September 1963 – January 1965
4. John Grant Glassco, 4 May 1968 – 20 September 1968 †
5. Robert Henry Winters, 12 September 1969 – 10 October 1969 †
6. John Henderson Moore, 1 March 1976 – 25 June 1979
7. Peter Frederick Bronfman, 29 June 1979 – 8 May 1991
8. John Trevor Eyton, 8 May 1991 – 1 August 1997

† = died in office

== Company histories ==
- Armstrong, Christopher, and Nelles, H. V. Southern Exposure: Canadian Promoters in Latin America and the Caribbean, 1896–1930. University of Toronto Press, 1988.
- Best, Patricia, and Shotell, Ann. The Brass Ring: Power, Influence and the Brascan Empire. Random House, 1988.
- McDowall, Duncan. The Light: Brazilian Traction, Light, and Power Company Limited, 1899–1945. University of Toronto Press, 1988.
