= Paul Bronfman =

Canadian entertainment industry executive

Paul Bronfman (May 28, 1957 – February 26, 2025) was a Canadian film and television industry executive and producer.

== Early life and education ==
Born in Montreal, Quebec, Bronfman was the son of Edward Bronfman, co-founder of Edper (later Brookfield Asset Management), and the nephew of Peter Bronfman. His grandfather, Allan Bronfman, was the brother of Seagram founder Samuel Bronfman. At age 20, Bronfman relocated to Toronto, aiming to develop a career distinct from his family's established reputation.

== Career ==
Bronfman began his career in the entertainment industry as a roadie for the band April Wine and later worked in post-production at Pathé Sound. In 1988, he established Comweb Corporation, a holding company for his media ventures. His first major project was the creation of North Shore Studios in Vancouver in collaboration with producer Stephen Cannell. The facility later served as a production site for television series including The X-Files.

Bronfman later acquired William F. White International, a film and television equipment rental company, financing the purchase by mortgaging his home. Under his management, the company grew to become a prominent provider of production equipment in Canada. In 2008, he founded Pinewood Toronto Studios, which includes one of the largest purpose-built sound stages in North America. He sold William F. White in 2019.

In 1995, Bronfman was diagnosed with multiple sclerosis. He initially kept the diagnosis private but eventually disclosed it and continued working in the industry. He made adaptations to accommodate his condition, including the use of a customized elevating wheelchair for professional events.

Bronfman served in various industry organizations, including the Academy of Canadian Cinema & Television and Film Ontario, and was a member of the Academy of Motion Picture Arts and Sciences.
