= Tritax EuroBox =

Property company of the United Kingdom

- Company type: Public limited company
- Traded as: LSE: EBOX
- Industry: Property investment
- Founded: 2018; 8 years ago
- Headquarters: London, United Kingdom
- Key people: Richard Orr (Chairman)
- Revenue: ▲€79.9 million (2023)
- Operating income: ▼€(238.77) million (2023) (2023)
- Net income: ▼€(229.79) million (2023) (2023)
- Parent: Brookfield Asset Management
- Website: www.tritax.co.uk

Tritax EuroBox plc is a British property investment company that invests in distribution centres across Europe. It was listed on the London Stock Exchange until it was acquired by Brookfield Asset Management in December 2024.

== History ==
The company is managed by Tritax, a property management business, formed in 1995. It was the subject of an initial public offering raising £300 million in July 2018. It raised a further £170 million in September 2021.

== Operations ==
The company owns, on behalf of its lessees, distribution centres across Europe the most significant of which is a large facility for the Spanish retailer, Mango, in Barcelona. The company's portfolio was valued at £1.8 billion as at 30 September 2022.

In September 2022, Tritax announced that the company had appointed Phil Redding, a previous partner at Tritax, to be fund manager of the company.

British property investment company Segro made a takeover offer for Tritax in September 2024, but was outbid the following month by Canada's Brookfield Asset Management for an enterprise value of £1.1 billion. The transaction was approved by the court on 6 December 2024, thereby allowing the deal to be completed.

== See also ==
- Tritax Big Box REIT
- Real estate investment trust
- UK Commercial Property REIT
