= Norcen =

Canadian petroleum company (1975–1998)

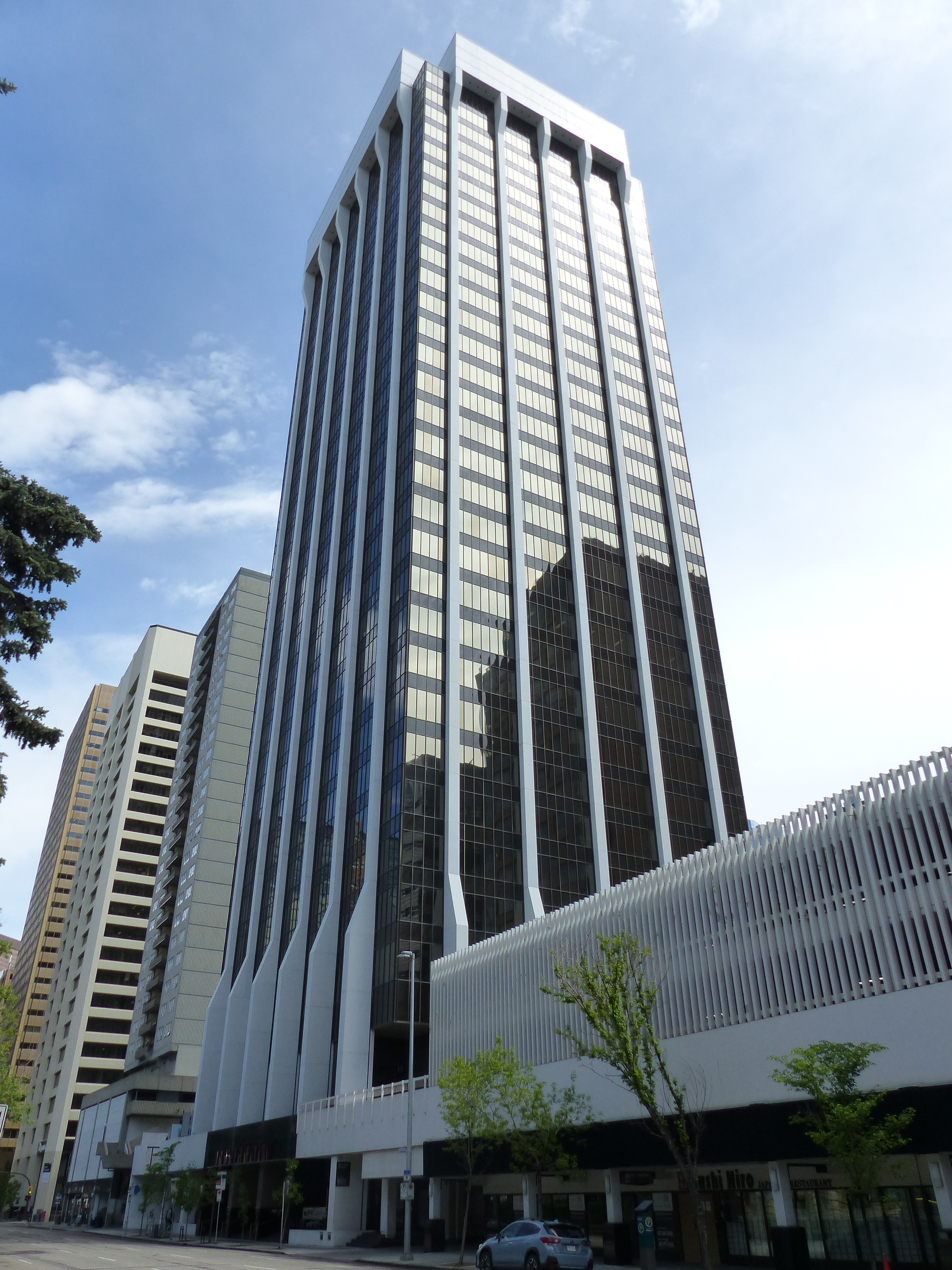
- The Norcen Tower in Calgary
- Traded as: TSX: NCN
- Industry: Petroleum
- Founded: 28 October 1975
- Defunct: 17 April 1998
- Fate: Acquired by Union Pacific Resources
- Headquarters: Norcen Tower, 715 5 Avenue SW, Calgary, Alberta

Norcen Energy Resources Limited was a Canadian petroleum company that existed from 1975 to 1998.

In December 1979, the Labrador Mining and Exploration Co. Ltd. of Toronto began purchasing shares of Norcen and acquired around nine percent of the company initially. Labrador was at the time 68 per cent owned by Hollinger Argus, which was controlled by Conrad Black. By February, Labrador had increased its stake in Norcen to around 40 per cent, and in April, Black was elected a director of Norcen.

In February 1986, Black sold Argus's 41 per cent stake in Norcen to Brascan.

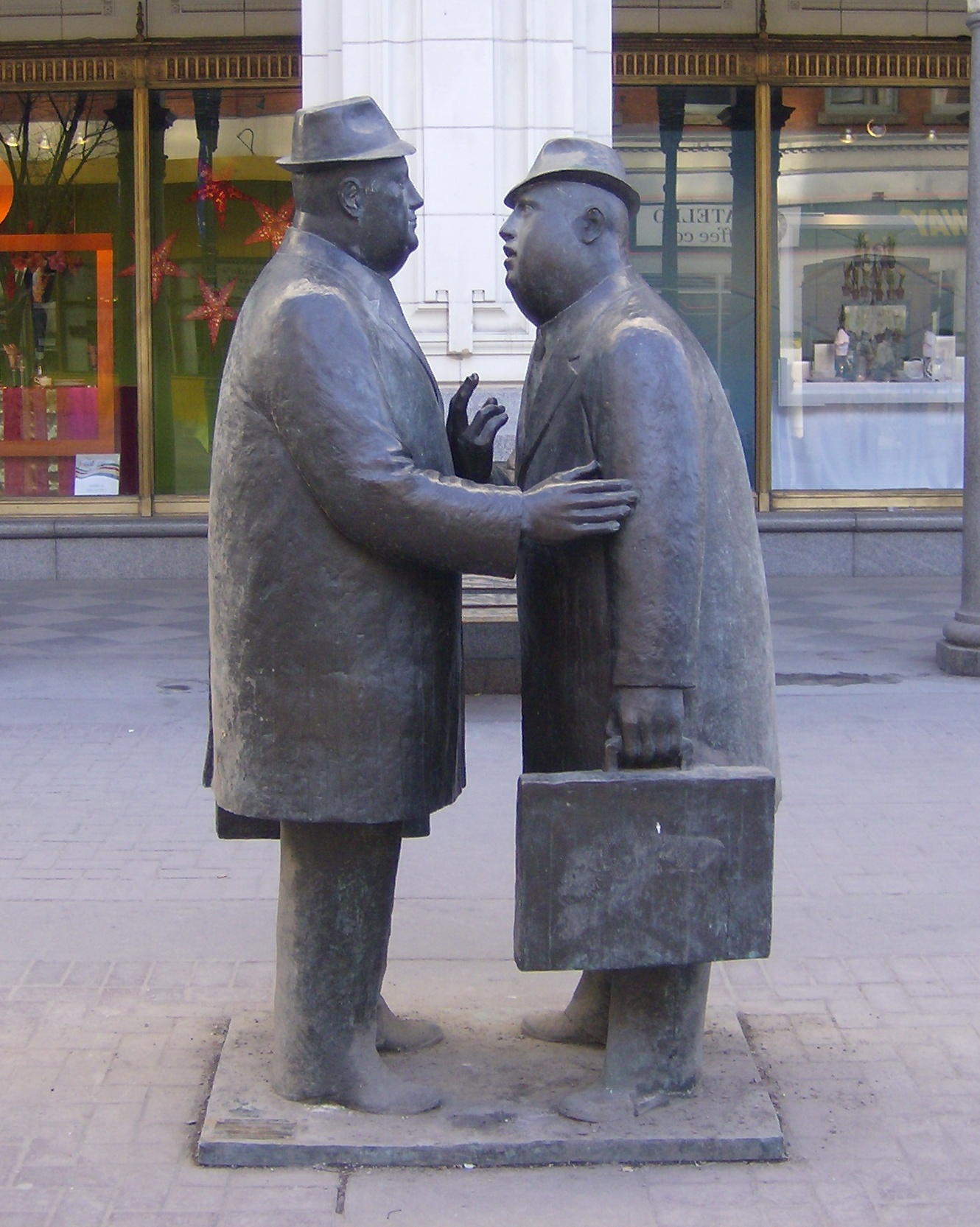
In 1978, Norcen chairman Ed Bovey commissioned William McElcheran to sculpt Conversation. In September 1981 the company donated the statue to the City of Calgary.

In January 1998, Union Pacific Resources of Fort Worth, Texas agreed to acquire Norcen for $3.7 billion. On 2 March 1998, Union Pacific closed the deal and assume around 95 per cent of outstanding Norcen shares. That same day, Norcen's shares were delisted. Three days later, Union Pacific acquired the remaining Norcen shares. Following the acquisition, Union Pacific appointed John Vering president of its Canadian subsidiary, Union Pacific Resources, Inc. On 17 April 1998, Norcen was disincorporated.

In April 2000, Anadarko Petroleum acquired Union Pacific Resources for US$3.9 billion.

== Leadership ==
=== President ===
1. Edward Gene Battle, 28 October 1975 – 31 December 1990
2. Barry Donald Cochrane, 1 January 1991 – 19 May 1994
3. Grant Donald Billing, 1 September 1994 – 3 March 1998

=== Chairman of the Board ===
1. Edmund Charles Bovey, 28 October 1975 – 15 April 1981
2. Conrad Moffat Black, 15 April 1981 – 18 April 1986
3. John Trevor Eyton, 18 April 1986 – 16 February 1988
4. Paul Macklin Marshall, 16 February 1988 – 31 December 1990
5. Edward Gene Battle, 1 January 1991 – 199?
