= Bruce Flatt =

Canadian businessman (born 1965)

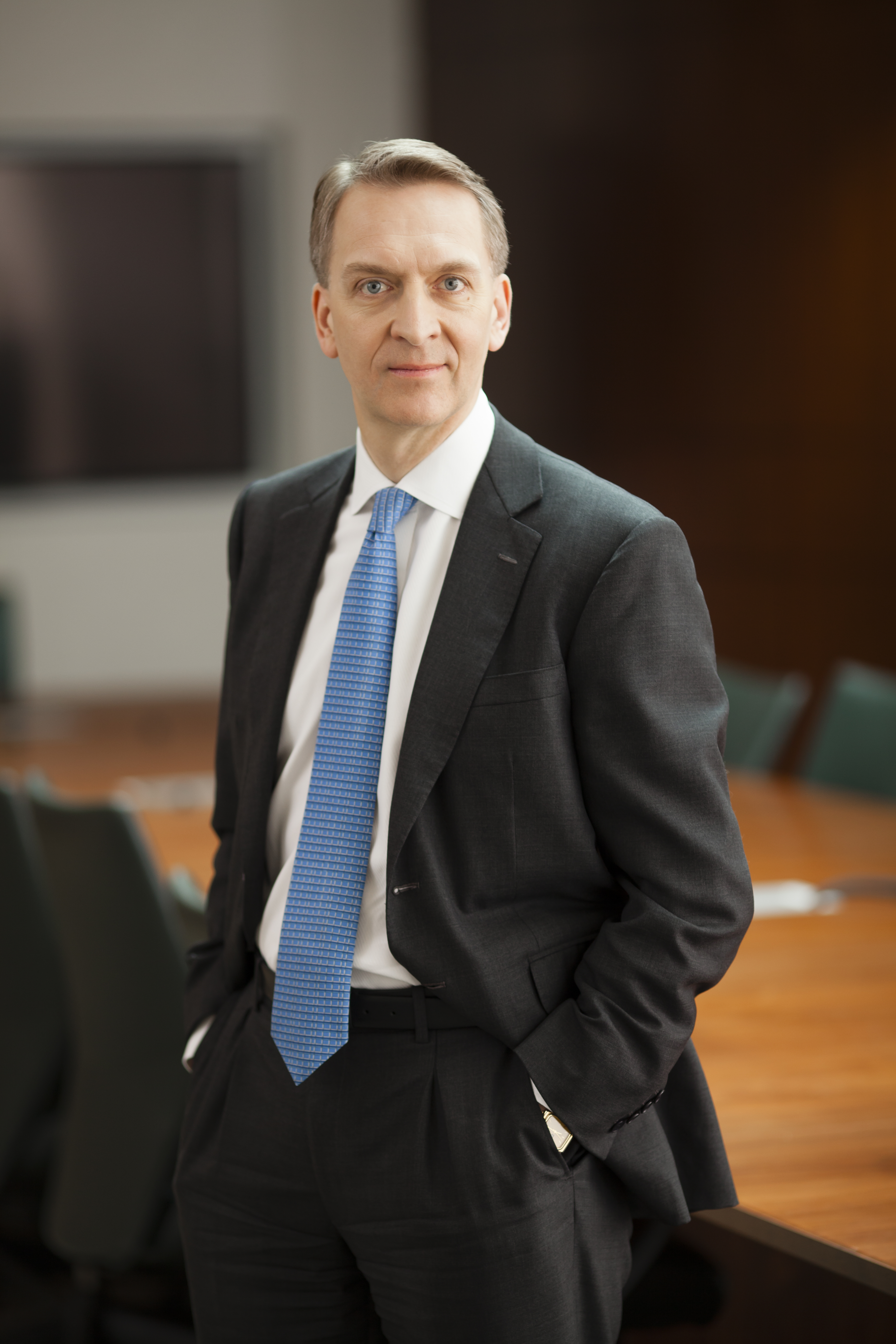
- Born: June 10, 1965 (age 61); Winnipeg, Manitoba, Canada
- Education: University of Manitoba (BComm)
- Occupations: CEO of Brookfield Corporation; Chairman of Brookfield Asset Management
- Spouse: Lonti Ebers
- Website: www.brookfield.com/about-us/leadership/bruce-flatt

James Bruce Flatt (born June 10, 1965) is a Canadian businessman and the CEO of Brookfield Corporation. He joined Brookfield in 1990 and became CEO in 2002. He has been referred to as "Canada's Warren Buffett" due to his "value" investment style, extended tenure as CEO, and large investment in Brookfield. As of 2026, he was ranked #612 on Forbes' Billionaires list with a net worth of US$6.8. billion.

== Career ==
Flatt, whose father was an executive at a Manitoba mutual fund company, was born in Canada in 1965. Following university, Flatt worked as a chartered accountant at Clarkson Gordon. Flatt joined the investment division of Brascan (Brookfield's predecessor) in 1990, became chief executive of Brookfield Properties in 2000 and CEO of the entire business in 2002.

As CEO of Brookfield Properties, Flatt led Brookfield's response to damage caused by the September 11, 2001 attacks in Lower Manhattan. Under Flatt, Brookfield became the second largest alternative-asset manager in the world, following the acquisition of a majority stake in Oaktree Capital Management in 2019.

Flatt and a group of partners own 20% of Brookfield, individually and through a company called Partners Limited.

In February 2026, he stepped down as CEO of Brookfield Asset Management, appointing Connor Teskey as the new CEO. Flatt remained as chairman of BAM and CEO of Brookfield Corporation.

== Recognition ==
Flatt was named CEO of the Year by The Globe and Mail in 2017, 60th in a list of the top 100 best-performing CEOs published by Harvard Business Review in 2018, and one of Bloomberg's 50 people who defined global business in 2019.

== Personal life ==
Flatt is married to art collector Lonti Ebers, who is the founder of a non-profit organization, Amant, and a trustee and patron of New York City's Museum of Modern Art.

He was educated at Grant Park High School and studied at the University of Manitoba.

Flatt lives in London and New York City.
