= Light S.A. =

Brazilian utility company

- Company type: Sociedade Anônima
- Traded as: B3: LIGT3
- Industry: Electricity
- Founded: 1904
- Headquarters: Rio de Janeiro, Brazil
- Key people: Octavio Lopes Pereira, (CEO)
- Products: Electrical power
- Services: Electricity distribution Electricity transmission
- Revenue: ▲US$ 4.3 billion (2021)
- Net income: ▲US$ 13.931 million (2021)
- Number of employees: 3,735
- Website: www.light.com.br

Light-Serviços de Electricidade S.A., known commonly as Light S.A. (Portuguese pronunciation: [ˈlajtʃ]) is a private sector public utility company of Rio de Janeiro, Brazil. Founded in 1904 in Toronto, Ontario, Canada by The Rio de Janeiro Tramway, Light and Power Co. Ltd., it was authorized to operate in Brazil in 1905.

Research activities of generation, distribution and sale of electricity and each of these areas is represented by a different company. Currently the controlling stake in Light is owned by CEMIG, an electric company based in Belo Horizonte.

== History ==
Electrical power infrastructure in Rio de Janeiro was originally developed in 1904 by the Rio de Janeiro Tramway, Light and Power Company, a company financed with foreign capital and legally domiciled in Toronto, Ontario, Canada. After 1912, this company was part of the holding company Brazilian Traction, Light and Power Company (usually known in Brazil simply as "Light"), which eventually changed its name to Brascan (for "Brasil" + "Canada"). In 1979, the company's Brazilian assets transferred to Brazilian ownership. The Canadian company, which had in the meantime diversified to other areas, still exists under the name Brookfield Asset Management.

On May 12, 2023, Light filed for bankruptcy.
