= Boardwalk Real Estate Investment Trust =

- Type: Public
- Traded as: TSX: BEI.UN
- Industry: Real Estate
- Founded: 1984
- Headquarters: Calgary, Alberta, Canada
- Key people: Sam Kolias (CEO)
- Number of employees: 1,300
- Website: www.bwalk.com

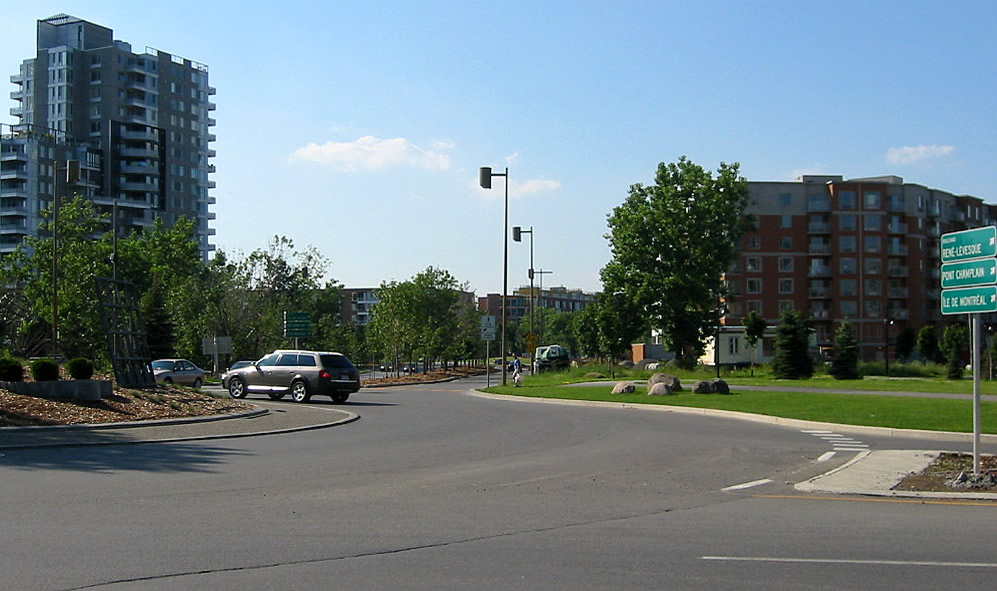
Nuns' Island

Boardwalk Real Estate Investment Trust is an open-ended real estate investment trust that owns Boardwalk Communities, Structures Metropolitaines, and Boardwalk Retirement Community.

== Overview ==
The company owns a mixture of high-rise, mid-rise and low-rise apartment buildings in the provinces of Alberta, Saskatchewan, British Columbia, Ontario and Quebec.

Boardwalk owns 260 properties with 36,418 units totalling approximately 31 million net rentable square feet.

== Listing ==
The company is listed on the Toronto Stock Exchange and as of May 5, 2020, it had a market capitalization of approximately $1.7 billion.

The majority of Nuns' Island in Montreal is owned by Boardwalk through Structures Metropolitaines.

== See also ==
- List of real estate companies of Canada
