= Edward Bronfman =

Canadian businessman (1927–2005)

- Born: Edward Maurice Bronfman; November 1, 1927; Montreal, Quebec, Canada
- Died: April 4, 2005 (aged 77); Toronto, Ontario, Canada
- Relatives: Peter Bronfman, brother Samuel Bronfman, uncle

Edward Maurice Bronfman OC (November 1, 1927 – April 4, 2005) was a Canadian businessman, philanthropist, and member of the Bronfman family.

Born in Montreal, Quebec, the son of Allan Bronfman and the nephew of Samuel Bronfman, founder of Seagram, he attended Selwyn House School, Bishop's College School and Babson College, where he graduated in 1950, with a degree in business administration. He founded (with his brother, Peter Bronfman) Edper Investments (now called Brookfield Asset Management), a conglomerate company which once had an estimated CAD $100 billion in assets under management and included several of the largest corporations in Canada. From 1971 to 1978, he and his brother owned the Montreal Canadiens. The team won four Stanley Cups under their ownership, in 1973, 1976, 1977 and 1978.

In 2000, he was made an Officer of the Order of Canada in recognition of his dedication to philanthropy.

He was married twice (once divorced), and had three sons, including film producer Paul Bronfman (1958-2025).

He died from colon cancer.

== See also ==
- List of Bishop's College School alumni
