= Balanced Commercial Property Trust =

British investment trust

- Company type: Commercial Property Investment Trust
- Traded as: LSE: BCPT; FTSE 250 component
- Industry: Investment trust
- Headquarters: London, United Kingdom
- Website: www.columbiathreadneedle.co.uk/balanced-commercial-property-trust/

Balanced Commercial Property Trust, formerly BMO Commercial Property Trust, is a large British investment trust dedicated to investments in commercial properties. Established in 2005, the company, which was formerly known as F&C Commercial Property Trust, was listed on the London Stock Exchange until it was acquired by Starwood Capital Group in November 2024.

== History ==
The company was established as F&C Commercial Property Trust in Guernsey in 2005. Having launched near the top of the market, following the market downturn in 2007–2008, a merger with UK Commercial Property Trust, a fellow FTSE 250 property company was proposed in 2010. This was narrowly rejected by 50.07% of shareholders. It restructured as a real estate investment trust in April 2019 and rebranded as BMO Commercial Property Trust in June 2019. It changed its name from BMO Commercial Property Trust to Balanced Commercial Property Trust in June 2022.

The real estate business, Starwood Capital Group, made an offer for the company worth around £673.5 million in September 2024. The transaction was approved by the court on 25 October 2024.
