= UK Commercial Property REIT =

British investment trust

- Company type: Public
- Traded as: LSE: UKCM
- Industry: Financial services
- Founded: 2006
- Headquarters: London, United Kingdom
- Key people: Ken McCullagh (Chairman)
- Products: Investment trust
- Website: www.ukcpreit.com

UK Commercial Property REIT, formerly UK Commercial Property Trust, was a large British investment trust dedicated to investments in UK commercial properties. Established in 2006, the company was listed on the London Stock Exchange until it was merged with Tritax Big Box REIT. The chairman was Ken McCullagh. It invested in shopping centres, shops, office buildings and industrial estates and warehousing/distribution centres.

== History ==
UK Commercial Property Trust was established in 2006 in Guernsey, prior to the introduction of REIT legislation in 2007, which made on-shore property investment companies more tax-efficient. It acquired its initial portfolio of properties from Phoenix & London Assurance/Phoenix Life & Pensions Limited in 2007 for £503.6m; the portfolio was then yielding under 5%.

Having launched near the top of the market, following the market downturn in 2007–2008, a merger with F&C Commercial Property Trust, a fellow FTSE 250 property company was proposed in 2010. This was narrowly rejected by 50.07% of shareholders.

The company changed its name from UK Commercial Property Trust to UK Commercial Property REIT in 2022.

In February 2024, the company announced it had reached a merger agreement with Tritax Big Box REIT. It was reported that the combined business was likely be included in the FTSE 100 Index with a valuation of £4 billion. The transaction received shareholder approval on 2 May 2024, allowing it to proceed to completion.
