= Henry Borden =

Canadian lawyer (1901–1989)

- Born: 25 September 1901; Halifax, Nova Scotia
- Died: 5 May 1989 (aged 87); Toronto, Ontario
- Education: McGill University (BA 1921); Dalhousie University (1924–26); Exeter College, Oxford (BA 1926)
- Spouse: Jean Creelman MacRae (m. 1929)

Henry Borden OC CMG QC (25 September 1901 – 5 May 1989) was a Canadian lawyer, businessman, and public servant. He was the nephew of prime minister Sir Robert Borden.

== Biography ==
Borden was born in Halifax, Nova Scotia, on 25 September 1901 to Henry Clifford Borden (1870–1943) and Mabel Ashmere Barnstead (1878–1905). Henry was the younger brother of Sir Robert Borden.

Henry Borden studied at McGill University, Dalhousie University, and was a Rhodes Scholar at Exeter College, Oxford from 1924 to 1927. In May of that year, Borden was called to the bar at Lincoln's Inn, and then also in the provincial bar of Nova Scotia and Ontario in August and November respectively. He was a founding partner of the Toronto law firm Borden & Elliot, which eventually merged into Borden Ladner Gervais, and was appointed King's Counsel in 1938.

At the outbreak of the Second World War, he was appointed to the War Supply Board. He would later serve as general counsel to the Department of Munitions and Supply. In 1942, he was appointed chairman of the War Time Industries Control Board. He was appointed a CMG for his wartime service.

Borden died on May 5, 1989.
