= Purplebricks Canada =

FairSquare Group Realty
- Formerly: ComFree, Purple Bricks
- Company type: Private
- Industry: Internet & Real Estate
- Founded: 8 January 2019
- Defunct: February 16, 2023
- Headquarters: Canada
- Areas served: Alberta, Manitoba, Ontario (Canada)
- Services: Real Estate Brokerage
- Number of employees: 200

Purplebricks Canada is a Canada-based real estate brokerage and a subsidiary of Desjardins Group.

== History ==
Initially known as ByTheOwner, it comprised PrivateRealEstate in Ontario, ComFree in Alberta, ComFree in Manitoba, and Skhomes4sale in Saskatchewan, was acquired by DuProprio in 2009. After the acquisition, the company was rebranded as the ComFree network.

In January 2012, the two ComFree Commonsense Network brokerages were launched in Ontario and Alberta.

In July 2013, WeList.com joined the ComFree network.

In 2015, DuProprio (the site's parent company) was purchased by Yellow Pages Group for $50 million.

In 2018, the Purplebricks purchased the Canadian real estate network ComFree/DuProprio for $51 million from the Yellow Pages Group.

Purplebricks rebranded the purchased network and launched in Canada on January 8, 2019. They operated as Purplebricks in ON, MB and AB.

In July 2020, Purplebricks Canada was acquired by Desjardins Group.

On December 1, 2021, Purplebricks rebranded as FairSquare Group Realty.

On February 16, 2023, FairSquare Group Realty’s social media pages and webpage were updated to include an announcement that it is no longer accepting new business. It was decided and announced internally the day prior, that the company was being dissolved.

== Services ==
Clients have their home listed on Purplebricks.ca and Realtor.ca through a board’s MLS® system. Purplebricks employs local Realtors who know the local real estate market. These Realtors provide clients with a home evaluation that includes pricing recommendations based on current market analysis of their local area. Clients pay a fee to list their home with Purplebricks rather than a commission based on the home’s value. The fee includes photography, a home listing on Realtor.ca and Purplebricks.ca, full-time customer support, and selling advice from a local Realtor. Clients also have a Realtor to handle offers, negotiations and paperwork, and the company manages booking showings.

Purplebricks offers a cash back Home Buying service to help clients find a home with the help of local Realtors who specialize in the field. They help the client find homes that match their criteria. Once a home is chosen, the Realtor helps the clients decide on an offer amount, handle the negotiations, navigate multiple offer situations, and finalize the deal.
