= Tritax Big Box REIT =

British investment trust

- Company type: Public limited company
- Traded as: LSE: BBOX; FTSE 100 component
- Industry: Property investment
- Founded: 2013; 13 years ago
- Headquarters: Duke Street, St James's, London, United Kingdom
- Key people: Richard Jewson (Chairman)
- Revenue: ▲£305.3 million (2025)
- Operating income: ▼£439.5 million (2025)
- Net income: ▼£363.3 million (2025)
- Website: tritaxbigbox.co.uk

Tritax Big Box REIT is a British real estate investment trust (REIT) investing in "Big Box" distribution centres. It is listed on the London Stock Exchange and is a constituent of the FTSE 100 Index.

== History ==
The company is managed by Tritax, a property management business, formed in 1995. It was the subject of an initial public offering raising £200 million in November 2013. It raised a further £150 million in July 2014, a further £110 million in November 2014 and a further £175 million in March 2015 as well as a £500 million lending facility. Addition funds were raised through placings in February 2016 and in September 2016.

In February 2024, the company announced it had reached a merger agreement with UK Commercial Property REIT. The transaction received shareholder approval on 2 May 2024, allowing it to proceed to completion.

== Operations ==
The company owns a distribution centre in Sherburn-in-Elmet leased to Sainsbury's, a distribution centre near Barlborough leased to Tesco and a Marks & Spencer distribution centre in Leicestershire. It also owns properties leased to Next plc, Morrisons, DHL Express, Rolls-Royce, L'Oréal, Kuehne + Nagel, Ocado, Dunelm Group, Howdens Joinery and T.K. Maxx. The company valued its portfolio at £4.8 billion as at 31 December 2023.
