= Macdonald Realty =

Canadian real estate company

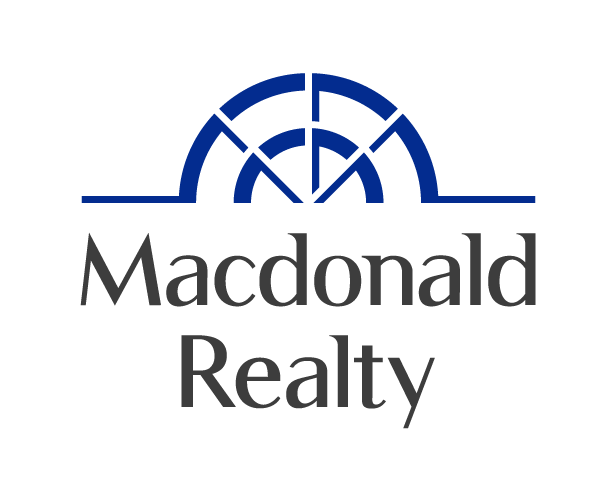
- Type: Corporation
- Industry: Real estate
- Founded: Vancouver, British Columbia, Canada (1944)
- Headquarters: Vancouver, British Columbia, Canada
- Key people: Lynn Hsu (Executive Chair); Dan Scarrow (President & CEO)
- Website: www.macrealty.com

Macdonald Realty is the residential division of Macdonald Real Estate Group Inc. (MREG). MREG is a privately owned Canadian real estate brokerage and advisory business with offices across British Columbia. Established in 1944, MREG offers a fully integrated range of real estate services, including: residential sales, commercial sales and leasing, property and strata management, project marketing, and development management services.

The Main Corporate Affiliates Include:

Company	Description
Macdonald Realty Ltd.	Residential brokerage
Macdonald Commercial Real Estate Services Ltd.	Commercial Sales and Leasing
Macdonald Property Management	Residential, Commercial, and Strata Management
Macdonald Platinum Marketing	New Development Marketing
Lyndan Properties	Real Estate Development

Macdonald employs over 1,000 associates and staff members in its 20 offices throughout the province.

The company's head office in Vancouver was recently named the top grossing brokerage office in the Vancouver Metropolitan Area by the Real Estate Board of Greater Vancouver and is one of the largest single brokerage offices in British Columbia.

== Management ==
Lynn Hsu, Executive Chair of the Macdonald Real Estate Group, started her real estate career in 1985. From 1987 through 1989, Lynn was the #1 salesperson for Western Canada at a large, national real estate firm, ranking in the top 3 for all of Canada for combined residential/commercial real estate sales during those years. In 1990, Lynn bought Macdonald Realty, then only a single office in Vancouver's Westside.

Since that time, she has expanded the company, growing it to 20 offices throughout British Columbia, with nearly 1,000 staff and sales associates, turning the operation into a true, full-service real estate company, with offerings in: Residential and Commercial Sales and Leasing, Property Management, Project Marketing, Mortgage Financing, and Project Management.

Over her career, Lynn has been honored many times for her achievements. These include:

- The Most Powerful in Residential Real Estate – 2016 (Swanepoel Power 200) – Rank # 105
- The Top 20 Women Leaders in Residential Real Estate – 2016 (Swanepoel Power 200)
- BC Business 50 Most Influential Women in BC – 2015 (BC Business)
- The Largest Company Owned by a Woman in BC — 2008 to 2015 (Business in Vancouver)
- Global Alliance Award for Most Outgoing Cross Border Referral – 2012 to 2014 (LeadingRE)
- Person of the Year in Chinese-Canadian Business Award – 2007
- Canadian Business Top 100 Canadian Women Entrepreneur Award – 2006 – Rank # 8
- Canadian Business Top 100 Canadian Women Entrepreneur Award – 2004 – Rank # 11
- The largest brokerage company in Western Canada – 2009 (Real Trends)
- Taiwanese Canadian Entrepreneur Award
- Overseas Chinese Achievement Award
- 40 Under 40 Achievement Award for Entrepreneurs in BC
