= Pacific Links International =

Operator of golf clubs

- Industry: Golf club operator
- Founded: 2012; 14 years ago in Canada
- Founder: Du Sha
- Headquarters: Canada
- Number of locations: 300 (2018)
- Owner: Du Sha
- Website: www.pacificlinks.com

Pacific Links International (est. in 2012) is an international golf club operator.

== History ==
Pacific Links International was established in 2012. By 2014, it owned 10 golf clubs in the US and through its network of owned, affiliate and reciprocal clubs controlled more than 100 clubs worldwide.

In 2015, Pacific Links International hired Tiger Woods to redesign Beijing Tian'an Holiday Golf Club.

In 2015 the company established Pacific Links Championship in Tianjin, China. In 2016 and 2017 it was held in Victoria, Canada.

As of 2018, the company controlled 700 golf properties located in 34 countries around the world. It also offered concierge services to its members.
