= Values: Building a Better World for All =

2021 book by Mark Carney

Value(s): Building a Better World for All
- Author: Mark Carney
- Language: English
- Subject: Economics
- Genre: Non-fiction
- Published: 2021
- Publication place: Canada; United States; United Kingdom
- Media type: Print (hardcover)
- Pages: 600pp
- Awards: National Business Book Award (2021)
- ISBN: 978-0-7710-5155-5
- OCLC: 1204645713
- LC Class: HM681 .C366 2021b

Value(s): Building a Better World for All is a 2021 non-fiction book by Mark Carney, the former governor of the Bank of Canada (2008–2013) and of the Bank of England (2013–2020) who became the 24th Prime Minister of Canada in 2025.

== Synopsis ==
Value(s) was published a year after Carney's tenure as governor of the Bank of England and four years before he became prime minister of Canada. The book examines the role of values in shaping social and economic systems and argues that the market economy has drifted from its moral foundations by prioritizing short-term financial gain over such societal values as fairness, resilience, and sustainability. Carney critiques the overreliance on market-driven solutions and calls for economic systems to prioritize moral values. Drawing on his central banking experience during the 2008 financial crisis and the COVID-19 pandemic, he explains how these crises further highlight the need for values.

== Publication ==
Value(s) was first published in 2021 by Signal Books, an imprint of Penguin Random House Canada. The book was simultaneously published in the United Kingdom by William Collins, an imprint of HarperCollins; and in the United States by PublicAffairs, an imprint of Perseus Books Group.

== Reception ==
Value(s) received mixed reviews, having been praised for its ambitious scope and vision but also criticized as being overly idealistic and lacking practical solutions. The book was the winner of the National Business Book Award in 2021.

In April 2025, a false quotation from the book began circulating online, erroneously claiming that Carney had made disparaging remarks regarding Western society. The image containing the false quote was republished by individuals such as Theo Fleury. The false quote appeared to be sentences from Peter Foster's 2021 review in the National Post, paraphrased, altered and attributed to Carney. The Canadian Press published a fact check regarding the quote and determined it to be false.
