= Cemp Investments =

Cemp Investments (1951–1987, succeeded by Claridge Investments) was the primary holding company and investment vehicle for, and named after, the four children of Samuel Bronfman: Charles Bronfman, Edgar Bronfman, Aileen "Minda" Bronfman de Gunzburg, and Phyllis Lambert, also known as the Montreal branch of the Bronfman family. Cemp became one of the largest privately owned companies in Canada. At its peak, it controlled tens of billions in dollars of assets in major distilling, commercial real estate development, oil and gas, and entertainment companies across North America.

== History and corporate structure ==
In 1951, the Bronfman family established two holding companies to hold the assets of the children of brothers Samuel and Allan, beginning with Seco Ltd. which held the stock in Distillers-Seagram Co. Ltd.: Cemp for the four children of Samuel, and Edper Investments for the two children of Allen. Each company was an amalgam of the children's names. Cemp's ownership was by a variety of trusts established to minimize exposure to taxes. When established, ownership was assigned 33% to Charles, 28% to Edgar, 18% to Minda, and 21% to Phyllis. Over time this changed depending on varying amounts of money withdrawn by each of the four. Cemp in turn was assigned 70% of Seco Ltd. and Edper 30%. Seco Ltd. held the siblings' shares in the family distilling empire, Distillers-Seagram Co. Ltd. Within a decade of its inception, Edper sold its share of Seco Ltd. to Cemp for CAD $16.6 million (approximately US$15 million), leaving the Montreal-based branch of the family the sole owner.

In Canada the company focused primarily in commercial real estate and the liquor business. Starting in the early 1960s, most of the Cemp's acquisitions and diversification were in the United States through its New York-based Seagram subsidiary, Seagram Co. Ltd. For much of its history, Cemp was run by Leo Kolber, who served as president. Following the death of Samuel Bronfman in 1971, control of Cemp and its subsidiaries was shared between brothers Charles (in Montreal) and Edgar (in New York).

In 1987, Charles Bronfman announced that Cemp was to be dissolved and the assets distributed to its individual family-member owners. At the time its major asset was a 40% stake in Cadillac Fairview Corp. Charles Bronfman said he would transfer his Cemp assets, as well as his own personal 16.5% stake in Seagram, into his own company, Claridge Investments.

== Major holdings ==
=== Seagram ===
During the time of Cemp's ownership of Seagram, the distilling empire established itself as one of the two largest distilling companies in North America and diversified into property development, natural resources, and entertainment. In 1955, Edgar Bronfman moved to New York to head up the Seagram's new US subsidiary, Seagram Co. Ltd., from which the company's greatest expansion occurred.

=== Cadillac Fairview ===
In 1958, Cemp established property developer Fairview Corporation. Its premiere development was the Mies van der Rohe-designed Toronto-Dominion Centre, an office tower complex that expanded to include multiple towers totaling over 4 million square feet. In 1974, Fairview merged with the Cadillac Development Corporation, which was founded in 1953, in Guelph, Ontario. Cemp owned 40% of the new Toronto-based Cadillac Fairview Corporation (CF). Together with partners Toronto-Dominion Bank and department store T. Eaton Company, it developed Vancouver's Pacific Centre and the Toronto Eaton Centre, each local landmarks. In 1975, Cadillac Fairview expanded into the U.S. real estate market. After the property development downturn in the early 1980s, Cemp sold its interests in CF in 1986.

=== Texas Pacific Oil ===
In 1963, Seagram Co. Ltd. purchased Texas Pacific Coal and Oil (later Texas Pacific Oil Company), the 5th largest independent oil producer in the United States, for US$280 million. Only $65 million of the purchase was made with equity; this financing has been described as an early example of leveraged buyout, whereby the share purchase was financed through future expected earnings, not assets. Seagram pursued investment in the oil industry in the United States due to more favorable American tax laws which helped them offset profits in its New York-based parent company with oil depletion allowances. In 1981, Seagram sold it to Sun Oil for $2.3 billion.

=== Paramount ===
In the early 1960s, Cemp acquired a 30% stake in Paramount Pictures and sold it in 1966 to Charles Bludhorn of Gulf & Western.

=== MGM ===
In 1968, Seagram Co. Ltd. purchased 15% of film studio Metro-Goldwyn-Mayer, and for a very short time was its largest and potentially controlling shareholder. This was Cemp's first significant venture into the entertainment industry and sold it several years later at a loss.

=== DuPont ===
In 1981, flush with cash from the sale of Texas Oil and Gas and looking to diversity their holdings, Seagram launched a takeover bid for Conoco. In the ensuing bidding war, DuPont Inc. took over Conoco Seagram swapped the 32% of Conoco they had just purchased for 20% of Dupont for approximately $3.28 billion. Seagram later raised its stake in Dupont to 24.1% and in 1995, sold the shares back to DuPont for US$8.8 billion.

=== Others ===
Cemp made numerous investments during its history, including taking ownership stakes in: Royalite Oil Company, a Western Canadian diversified oil production and distribution company later sold to British-American Oil; Polaroid Corporation; Cineplex Odeon; and Ticket Reservation Systems, a pioneering computerized sales system for entertainment tickets founded in 1966.

== Legacy ==
Following the dissolution of Cemp in 1987, and the replacement of Edgar Bronfman Sr. by his son, Edgar Bronfman Jr., at the helm in 1994, Seagram embarked on a series of major acquisitions and new directions.

- Tropicana: In 1988, Seagram purchased the U.S.-based fruit juice group Tropicana from Beatrice Foods for $1.2 billion. It was sold in 1998 to PepsiCo for US$3.3 billion.
- Time Warner: In 1994, Seagram acquired a 14.5% stake in media giant Time Warner. It sold its holdings in 1997 and 1998, providing a pretax profit of US$2.13 billion.
- MCA: In 1995, following sale of its DuPont interests, Seagram purchased 80% of entertainment conglomerate MCA Inc. for US$5.7 billion from Matsushita Electric Industrial Company (Panasonic) of Japan. This dramatic change of direction for Seagram was made under the direction of its new chairman, Edgar Bronfman Jr. (grandson of Samuel Bronfman). MCA's major assets included Universal Pictures, Universal Studios theme parks, MCA Television, MCA Music Entertainment, Putnam Publishing, and partial ownership of the Cineplex Odeon chain of theaters and USA Network. MCA is renamed Universal Studios. In 1997, Seagram bought the remaining 50% of USA network from Viacom for US$1.7 billion.
- PolyGram: In 1998, Seagram purchased PolyGram for US$10.6 billion in cash and shares from Philips, which created the world's largest music company.

=== Vivendi ===
In 2000, Seagram was sold to France-based Vivendi for US$34 billion in stock that provided the Bronfmans with a significant shareholding in Vivendi. The company was renamed Vivendi Universal. Within two years it virtually collapsed under the leadership of its French chairman, Jean-Marie Messier. This resulted in a US$5 billion loss to the Bronfman family, in one of the greatest financial losses ever by a single family. Charles Bronfman called the legacy of the decision of selling Seagram "a disaster" and "a family tragedy".

== See also ==
- History of private equity and venture capital
