= Edper Investments =

Canadian holding company (1959–1995)

Edper Investments Ltd. was the primary holding company and investment vehicle for brothers Edward Bronfman and Peter Bronfman between 1959 and 1995. At its peak in the 1980s, and early 1990s, Edper was one of the largest corporate conglomerates in Canada, controlling more than 500 private and publicly traded companies in a complex structure that was estimated to be worth $100 billion, employed more than 100,000 Canadians, and comprised 15% of the total capitalization of the Toronto Stock Exchange.

Edper, whose name is an amalgam of the names of the two Toronto-based brothers, was initially financed with proceeds from their interests in the Seagram Company Ltd. The main investments of their cousins in the Montreal-based branch were managed through their own holding company, Cemp Investments.

== History ==
Edper was established in 1959 with approximately US$15 million in proceeds from the half of their shares in Seagrams they were forced to sell by the Montreal branch of the family, who retained control. Over the following four decades, Edper grew from a family holding of shares in a single company to a vast conglomerate with a reputation for corporate takeovers in some of Canada's largest companies. Below is an outline timeline:

- 1954: Edper Holdings established as a trust for brothers Edward and Peter.
- 1959: Edper Investments Ltd.is established.
- 1989: Edper Investments Ltd. is renamed Edper Enterprises and makes its first public offering.
- 1989-95: The Bronfmans divest themselves of all holdings of Edper.
- 1995: The Pagurian Corporation approved changing its name to The Edper Group Limited.
- 1996: Hees International Bancorp Inc. and The Edper Group Limited amalgamated to form The Edper Group Limited
- 1997: The Edper Group Ltd. and Brascan Ltd. amalgamated to form EdperBrascan Corporation
- 2000: EdperBrascan Corporation changed its name to Brascan Corporation
- 2005: Brascan Corporation changed its name to Brookfield Asset Management Inc. (BAM).

=== Structure ===
The ownership of Edper Investments Ltd. was held by the personal trusts of brothers Edward and Peter. Its structure changed after 1989, but for most of its existence it was owned by the private trusts of each brother. The Edper corporate empire was noted for its intricate web of ownership and control that extended from the top tier. Its organizational structure was described as "very, very complex" and "dizzying" Through careful use of labyrinthine accounting and complex strategies and corporate structures, Edper capitalized on Canada's relatively lax securities laws, tax laws, and disclosure requirements that resulted in its rapid growth into a highly complex, pyramidal empire of interwoven companies and cross-ownership. Edper controlled but did not own many companies. Privately held Edper could own a controlling stake in one public company that would hold a controlling stake in another public one that would hold a controlling stake in yet another, without having to use much of its own money. Other strategies used were cross-ownership and partial ownership of a parent company by its subsidiary and the liberal use of restricted or non-voting shares for public investors and super-voting shares for insiders. These enabled the Edper empire to raise billions of dollars without having to use much of its own money. During the Eighties boom, Bronfman-connected companies issued more securities than anyone else in Canada and raised more than $30-billion in equity. In addition to the two brothers, who were heavily involved in the management of Edper and many of its subsidiaries, there were two other men who played key roles in the Edper group's rapid expansion and management: accountant Jack Cockwell hired by the Bronfmans in the 1960s who later headed Hees International/Bancorp, Edper Equities, and Edper Investments; and Trevor Eyton, a corporate lawyer who headed Brascan Ltd. following Edper's acquisition.

=== Debt and collapse ===
After its peak in 1989, several factors combined to cause a near-collapse of Edper's empire in the early 1990s: a major economic recession, the Olympia and York collapse, a meltdown in commercial real estate that affected both revenue and valuation of key assets, increased scrutiny of leveraged financing and complex ownership structures.

For revenue, the Edper corporate structure relied heavily on dividend payouts from subsidiaries to their parent companies to cover debt obligations. It was estimated their pay-out ratio was half again as large as the average of the top 35 companies on the Toronto Stock Exchange. Some Bronfman companies paid out more in dividends than they registered in earnings. To cover their cascading losses in 1991-93, the Edper companies raised more than $9-billion through share issues, asset sales and debt financing in just 20 months. By early 1993, Edper began selling assets, notably $1.96 billion worth in February alone. Edper's market capitalization decreased 90% between 1989 and 1993.

=== Transition ===
In order to provide Edward with a way to extract himself from the companies while allowing Peter to remain in control, Edper Enterprises was created as the new main holding company for the group and in 1989 issued shares to the public. Majority ownership was retained by Edper Holdings, which by then was owned 50.1% by Edper Investments (Peter) and 49.9% by Pagurian Corporation, which was in turn was controlled by a group led by Jack Cockwell. By careful use of structured partnerships with Peter Bronfman and control of cash flow, Jack Cockwell in effect took over Edper.

== Major holdings ==
Edper had direct and indirect ownership interests in numerous companies. Below is a list of the largest and most significant to its corporate empire.

=== Carena Bancorp ===
In 1971, the Canadian Arena Company (Carena) was purchased for $15 million from the Molson family by Placements Rondelle Ltée, ("Puck Investments Ltd." in English), a consortium of owners led by the Bronfman brothers. Carena was the owner of the National Hockey League Montreal Canadiens and the manager of the Montreal Forum. In 1978, the Canadiens team was sold to Molson Breweries for $20 million.

Under Bronfman ownership Carena expanded its property development holdings, including Trizec Corporation. In 1978, Carena Bancorp Holdings Inc. was formed, it later became Carena Developments Ltd., and in 1996 Brookfield Properties. After acquiring Trizec, Carena expanded its real estate holdings aggressively.

In 1989, Carena acquired one-third of Olympia & York's World Financial Property, L.P., owner of New York City's World Financial Center adjacent to the World Trade Center but was struggling under heavy debt and collapsing office market. With Edper's financial backing, Carena expanded during the recession of the early 1990s. O&Y collapsed in 1992, and four years later the slimmed-down company emerged from bankruptcy with Carena (as Brookfield Properties Corporation) owning a 47% stake.

=== Trizec ===
In 1970, the Bronfman brothers were brought onto the board of Toronto-based Trizec Corporation Ltd., one of Canada's largest property developers, and given a 9% equity stake. Trizec had been formed to build Montreal's iconic Place Ville Marie and later acquired control of the development arm of BCE Inc. (parent of Bell Canada), owner of BCE Place and property valued at billions of dollars. In 1976, Carena acquired a 25% equity interest and effective voting control of Trizec; the holding was increased to 50.1% later in the 1970s.

After the Canada created the Foreign Investment Review Agency in 1974 to regulate foreign investment, concerns arose about the ability to raise future investment money for a foreign-owned company (Eagle Insurance of Britain still held a majority stake in Trizec). In 1975, an agreement was reached with Edper that would leave Eagle Star with a controlling interest in Trizec, while effective control would move to a new Brofman-controlled holding company, Carena Properties. By 1976, the Bronfmans took control of Trizec and moved the head office to Calgary. By 1979, Trizec's assets surpassed $1 billion in value. That same year a bidding war developed for UK-based English Property between Olympia & York, Dutch real estate company NV Beleggingsmaatschppij Wereldhave, and Eagle Star Insurance (which was heavily invested in English Property). Concerned about securing their ownership in Trizec, the Bronfmans came to an agreement with Olympia & York's Reichmann brothers to avoid future competition between their property development concerns, Canada's two largest. Transactions were then undertaken that resulted in both Edper and O&Y having an equal 37% stake in Trizec. In 1980, Trizec acquired the US-based Ernest W. Hahn Inc.'s shopping center interests, raising Trizec's assets to $2 billion, and Trizec was renamed TrizecHahn. Two years later Trizec's assets were valued at $4 billion. By 1990, the recession in commercial real estate became acute and both TrizecHahn and Olympia and York struggled with debt. Following outside infusion of capital into Trizec in 1994, Edper's stake was reduced to a nominal amount.

* Bramalea: In 1984, Trizec acquired an initial 18% ownership stake in its rival, Toronto-based Bramalea Ltd., for $160 million. Bramalea held more than 20 million square feet of commercial, retail, and industrial real estate across North America. It was a residential community developer and builder, and had oil and gas interests through Coseka Resources Ltd. In 1986, Trizec and Bramalea combined their retail assets into a new entity, Trilea Centres, which eventually owned and operated 28 shopping centers across Canada, and Trizec increased its ownership in Bramalea to 61%. By 1990, Bramalea had taken on $5 billion debt used for acquisitions and expansion in Canada and the United States. The recession of the early 1990s, forced it to sell many assets at reduced prices and it defaulted on its loans in 1992. Carena Developments Ltd, which owned 40% of Trizec, injected more capital. In December 1992, Bramalea voluntarily filed for bankruptcy protection with $3.8 billion in debts. In April 1995, Bramalea went bankrupt; in May 1995, its US subsidiary, Newport Beach CA-based Bramalea of California Inc., closed in the largest collapse of a housing developer in US history.

* BCE Development Corporation: In 1989, Trizec subsidiary Brookfield Properties acquired 50% (later 100%) of major properties from Toronto-based BCE Development, one of Canada's largest commercial property developers The company began as Dawson Developments Ltd. in 1964, then Daon Development Corporation from 1973, was purchased by BCE Inc. in 1986. It was renamed Brookfield Development in 1990 and BF Realty Holdings Limited in 1991.

=== Great Lakes Group ===
Great Lakes Group, a northern-Ontario based producer and distributor of electric power, had been owned by Brascan before it was transformed into a holding company. By 1984, Brascan owned 49% of the company and it was transformed into a brokerage company to take advantage of financial deregulation with holdings in Royal Trustco, Trilon Financial, and Brascan. By 1990, Hees had acquired a 35% stake and Trilon 11%. The company was later named Brascan Power, one of Canada's largest power generators. It is currently named Brookfield Renewable.

=== Hees Bancorp ===
Hees began as National Hees Enterprises Limited in 1975, changed its name to Hees International Corporation in 1983, and to Hees International Bancorp Inc. in 1988. Merchant bank Hees International Bancorp served "as the nerve centre for Brascan" in the late 1980s. Hees' Jack Cockwell was a key strategist, investing Bronfman money in numerous publicly traded firms and gaining significant or controlling interest. Prior to the two companies merging to form Edper Group Limited in 1996, the Edper group owned 39% of Hees. Hees in turn owned large shareholdings in some of the same companies as did Edper's other holdings. Hees also acquired companies without Edper's direct involvement, including the following:

* Versatile: In 1987, Hees acquired 40% of Winnipeg-based Versatile Corporation, one of Canada's largest farm equipment manufacturers and shipbuilders. The company began as a Winnipeg-based farm equipment manufacturer, the company had expanded into the energy sector and into shipbuilding through its purchase of Davie Shipbuilding in 1985. By 1987 the firm was bankrupt and Hees assumed control in a workout by swapping debt for an equity stake. It was sold in 1993.

* Continental Bank of Canada: In 1981, the Toronto-based Continental Bank of Canada was created, with Hees International holding the largest block of shares. By 1986, the bank was the 6th largest Canadian retail bank and the 15th largest financial institution in the country. That same year it acquired by UK-based Lloyds Bank which in turn was later acquired by Hong Kong Bank of Canada.

=== Pagurian ===
Pagurian began as Interpublishing Limited and Pagurian Press Ltd., which was founded by Philip Christopher Ondaatje. It was incorporated in Ontario in 1975, and changed its name to The Pagurian Corporation Limited in 1977. By 1988 it had diverse assets worth over $500 million and controlled assets of over $1 billion when Ondaatje sold it to Hees International in 1988, and became vice-chairman of Hees. Pagurian was controlled by Hees Bancorp's Jack Cockwell and the senior Edper group managers. By 1993, ownership in Edper Holdings was 50.1% by Edper Investments and 49.9% by Pagurian Corporation. In 1997, what began as a subsidiary of a subsidiary of Edper's, took over Edper and adopted its former corporate grandparent's name; Pagurian was renamed The Edper Group Ltd.

=== Brascan ===
Edper acquired Toronto-based Brascan Ltd., a widely held holding company with diversified interests in mining, forestry, brewing, and Brazilian-based power and transportation interests, in 1979. The acquisition began quietly in 1978, and soon became a hostile takeover which ultimately resulted in 1979 Carena Bancorp's owning 50.1% of Brascan.

In March, 1979, Edper Investments created Edper Equities Ltd. for the purpose of acquiring control or ownership of Brascan, with Edper Investments owning 66% and Patino, N.V. of the Netherlands 34% of Edper Equities. After an initial purchase of approximately 5%, Edper increased its stake to 31% over a two-day period by arranging purchases on the American Stock Exchange, the exchange's largest transaction to date, despite Brascan not being listed there. Edper issued statements stating it was not attempting a takeover of Brascan. As defensive moves, Brascan announced a $1.12 billion bid for F.W. Woolworth Company which Edper strongly and publicly opposed. Brascan received a restraining order in US District Court preventing Edper from acquiring exercising more than 5% of its shares due to alleged violations of the US securities laws. After the restraining order was removed, in June 1979, Edper issued a new bid to raise its ownership. Brascan issued a statement in support and Edper was successful in increasing its ownership to 50.1%.

Subsequently, the Ontario Securities Commission amended its rules to prevent takeovers of companies listed on the Toronto Stock Exchange (such as Brascan) being conducted against its rules even in other jurisdictions, such as Edper's undeclared takeover of Brascan on the AMEX.

Eventually Brascan merged with Edper and since 2000 has been known as Brookfield Asset Management.

* Noranda: In 1981, Brascan, through its Brascade subsidiary, became the largest shareholder of Toronto-based Noranda Mines (later named Noranda Inc.), one of Canada's largest multinational mining companies. Under Edper's/Brascan's control the company expanded and diversified rapidly in Canada, the United States, and South America. It expanded into different markets, including oil and gas, forestry, and pulp and paper.

* Norcen Energy Resources: In 1986, Noranda acquired 49% of Calgary-based Norcen and increased its interest in North Canadian Oils Ltd. After the two companies combined, it became Canada's 8th largest natural gas producer. It was sold in 1998 to Union Pacific Resources for US$3.5 billion.

* MacMillan Bloedel: In 1982, Noranda Inc. purchased 49.8% of Canada's largest paper producer, Vancouver-based MacMillan Bloedel Ltd., for $623. It was sold in 1993 for $793.

* Falconbridge: In 1989, Noranda acquired 50% of Toronto-based Falconbridge Ltd., one of Canada's largest mining companies.

* John Labatt: In 1967, Brascan made its first acquisition of stock in Toronto-based John Labatt Ltd., Canada's second largest brewer and 90% owner of the 1992 World Series Winner Toronto Blue Jays baseball team (from the team's creation in 1976). Brascan sold its stake in 1993 as part of the Edper's struggles with debt.

=== Trilon Financial ===
In 1982, Trilon Financial Corporation was created as a subsidiary of Brascan Ltd. at a time when deregulation permitted financial companies to enter new markets and to acquire the London Life Insurance Company and the Royal Trust Company, both of which Brascan held substantial minority positions. Within its first six months, Trilon became Canada's sixth largest financial institution, behind only the big five Canadian banks. It also expanded into leasing and foreign markets. In, the Reichmann brothers acquired a 13% interest.

It expanded such that by 1990 it was the largest retail diversified financial services company in Canada and in 1996 had revenues of $6.2 billion. In 2002, it was renamed Brascan Financial.

* Royal Trustco: In 1983 Trilon purchased 42% of Toronto-based Royal Trust Company, one of Canada's largest trust companies and mortgage providers. Its retain trust operations were sold in 1993 to the Royal Bank of Canada. The remainder became Gentra Inc. and later Brookfield Office Properties.

* Royal LePage: In 1983, Royal Trust acquired A.E. LePage, the country's largest commercial real estate brokerage, which was sold to parent company Trilon in 1987.

* London Life Insurance Company: Between 1982 and 1983, Trilon acquired 98% of Toronto-based London Life Insurance Company, one of Canada's largest property and life insurance companies.

== Legacy ==
The Bronfman brothers participation in Edper and its subsidiaries ended in 1995, but most of the companies continued. The three major holding companies of the Edper empire – Edper, Hees, Pagurian – were all taken over by Brascan during the 1990s and early 2000s. Jack Cockwell and Trevor Eyton reorganized Brascan and its subsidiaries into a much simpler corporate structure, with three main divisions: real estate (from TrizecHahn), power (from Brascan), and financial services (formerly Trilon).

Trilon continued as served largely as the financial arm of Brascan and in 2002, Brascan took over the remaining shares of Trilon it didn't already own. In 2002, Brascan renamed itself Brookfield Asset Management. In 2006, Trizec Properties Inc. and its Canadian affiliate Trizec Canada Inc. merged with Brookfield Properties Corp. (formerly Carena) in a deal valued at US$8.9 billion.
