= Brookfield Renewable Partners =

Publicly traded limited partnership that owns and operates renewable power assets

Brookfield Renewable Partners L.P.
- Type: Public
- Traded as: NYSE: BEP; NYSE: BEPC; Russell 1000 component (BEPC); TSX: BEP.UN
- Industry: Renewable power
- Founded: 2011; 15 years ago
- Headquarters: Toronto, Ontario, Canada
- Key people: Connor Teskey (CEO; also CEO of BAM from 4 Feb 2026); Jeffrey M. Blidner (Chairman)
- Services: Independent Power Producer
- Revenue: ▲US$6.41 billion (2025); US$5.88 billion (2024)
- Net income: ▲US$712 million (2025); US$(9) million (net loss) (2024)
- Total assets: ▼US$98.7 billion (2025); US$126 billion (2024)
- Total equity: ▼US$35.0 billion (2025); US$36.5 billion (2024)
- Number of employees: approximately 5,870 (2025 including consolidated portfolio companies)
- Parent: Brookfield Corporation (holds ~45% economic interest; BAM acts as investment manager)
- Subsidiaries: Great Lakes Power and Isagen S.A., among others
- Website: bep.brookfield.com

Brookfield Renewable Partners L.P. is a publicly traded limited partnership that owns and operates renewable power assets, with corporate headquarters in Toronto, Ontario, Canada. It is approximately 45% owned by Brookfield Asset Management.

Brookfield Asset Management claims to have "more than 100 years of experience as an owner, operator and developer of hydroelectric power facilities." It was founded in the 1890s in Brazil, where the company installed the first electrical lights and tramways in São Paulo and Rio de Janeiro.

== Corporate structure ==
The company was established as Brookfield Renewable Energy Partners in 2011, when Brookfield Asset Management combined the hydroelectric stations and wind farms of the Brookfield Renewable Power Fund with those of Brookfield Renewable Power Inc. The company changed its name to Brookfield Renewable Partners in 2016.

=== Brookfield Renewable Power fund ===
Brookfield Renewable Power Fund originated as the Great Lakes Hydro Income Fund before changing its name in 2009. Brookfield used its majority stake in Great Lakes Power as its primary vehicle to advance its interests in the renewable energy sector. When Great Lakes Hydro Income Fund completed its initial public offering on the Toronto Stock Exchange in 1999, Brookfield Asset Management (then known as EdperBrascan) owned 61% of outstanding units through its various subsidiaries. Initially, Great Lakes Hydro's assets were limited to three hydroelectric facilities in Western Quebec with a combined capacity of 238MW. By the end of 2008, the fund owned and operated 27 hydroelectric facilities and one wind farm with a cumulative capacity of 1,021MW. These assets were spread across four jurisdictions: Ontario, Quebec, British Columbia, and New England.

=== Brookfield Renewable Power Inc. ===
Brookfield Renewable Power Inc. was a wholly owned subsidiary of Brookfield Asset Management with a 50.01% share in Brookfield Renewable Power Fund. It was the subsidiary in which Brookfield Asset Management held all of its renewable energy assets, whereas the Brookfield Renewable Power Fund's scope was limited to the 1,652MW of generation capacity located in Ontario, Quebec, British Columbia, and New England.

=== Brookfield Renewable Energy Partners, LP ===
On September 13, 2011, Brookfield Asset Management and Brookfield Renewable Power Fund announced they intended to merge the Fund and the power-generating assets owned by Brookfield Renewable Power Inc. to form Brookfield Renewable Energy Partners, LP. When the transaction closed, Brookfield Asset Management owned 73% of the combined entity, which trades on the Toronto Stock Exchange under the symbol BEP-UN and on the New York Stock Exchange as BEP. The new entity is the primary vehicle through which Brookfield acquires and operates renewable energy assets, with initial assets, and development projects in Canada, the US, and Brazil. The transaction closed on November 30, 2011.

In 2012, it opened the 165.6MW Comber wind farm in Essex County, Ontario. The same year, the company and its investment partners bought four hydroelectric power plants in the southeastern U.S. from Alcoa for $600 million.

In 2014, the company and its investment partners acquired a portfolio of wind power assets in Ireland, establishing its presence in Europe for a total enterprise value of approximately $960 million.

In 2016, the company and its investment partners acquired a majority stake in Colombian power company Isagen, which operates Colombia's largest hydropower plant, for approximately C$2.8 billion. The company subsequently increased its interest to almost 100%.

On May 10, 2016, Brookfield Renewable Energy Partners L.P. changed its name to Brookfield Renewable Partners L.P. The stock symbol and CUSIP would remain the same.

In March 2017, the company announced it would acquire a controlling interest in TerraForm Power and 100% of TerraForm Global, together representing a 3,600 MW global renewable power portfolio. The transaction was completed in December 2017. In March 2020, the company announced it would be acquiring the remaining stake of TerraForm Power. The acquisition is set to be completed in Q3 2020.

On December 14, 2020, Brookfield Renewable Partners and its institutional partners purchased a 1 GW-plus distributed generation (DG) solar platform from Exelon Corp in a deal worth US$810 million.

In October 2022, Brookfield Renewable Partners together with Cameco announced the acquisition of Westinghouse Electric Company, then owned by its sister company Brookfield Business Partners, in a US$7.9 billion deal including debt. Brookfield Renewable would own a 51% interest in the company as part of the deal. The acquisition was completed in November 2023.

== See also ==
- List of renewable energy companies by country
