= Trevor Eyton =

Canadian businessman, lawyer, and politician (1934–2019)

The Honourable J. Trevor Eyton

Canadian Senator from Ontario
- In office September 23, 1990 – July 12, 2009
- Appointed by: Brian Mulroney

Personal details
- Born: John Trevor Eyton; July 12, 1934 Quebec City, Quebec, Canada
- Died: February 24, 2019 (aged 84) Toronto, Ontario, Canada
- Party: Progressive Conservative (1990–2004); Conservative (2004–2009)
- Spouse: Barbara Jane Montgomery (m. 1955)
- Education: University of Toronto (BA, LLB)

John Trevor Eyton, OC QC (July 12, 1934 – February 24, 2019) was a Canadian businessman, lawyer, and Senator.

== Life and career ==
Eyton was born in Quebec City in 1934 and was educated and raised in Quebec and Toronto, Ontario. He was educated at Beaupré Public School and Jarvis Collegiate Institute. In 1957 he received his Bachelor of Arts from the University of Toronto, and earned his Bachelor of Laws from the University of Toronto Law School in 1960.

After completing his studies, Eyton joined the law firm of Tory Tory DesLauriers & Binnington, where he remained until 1979 when he left to become president and chief executive officer of Brascan Limited, a post he held for 12 years. Eyton remained with Brascan as chairman and senior chairman until 1997 and served on its board of directors. He was appointed to the Senate of Canada in 1991 by Brian Mulroney

Eyton was a board member of a number of corporations, including Coca-Cola Enterprises (Atlanta), General Motors of Canada, Noranda, Nestle Canada and Coretec, and served as Chairman and a director of Ivernia West. He was involved in amateur sport and philanthropic organizations including Junior Achievement, the Canadian Olympic Foundation and is Chairman of Canada's Sports Hall of Fame. Senator Eyton is a member of the Canadian Journalism Foundation, the Canadian Institute for Advanced Research, and the Advisory Committee of the Toronto Zoo Foundation.

For many years Eyton sat on the board of Grenville Christian College during the period that Father Charles Farnsworth was headmaster of the school. The former Canadian private school is now the subject of a class action lawsuit. Widespread child abuse has been alleged in the media where it has also been alleged that the school was operated as a mind control cult.

In the 1980s Eyton organized a consortium intended to fund Toronto's Skydome sports stadium with private financing. Massive cost overruns ended up costing taxpayers hundreds of millions of dollars.

Eyton was an Officer of the Order of Canada, Queen's Counsel for Ontario, and was awarded honorary Doctors of Laws by both the University of Waterloo and the University of King's College at Dalhousie – where he was Chancellor from 1996 to 2001. In 2000 he was awarded Mexico’s Order of the Aztec Eagle – the highest award given to foreigners by the government of Mexico.

In his spare time he enjoyed skiing and golf. Trevor Eyton married to Barbara Jane Montgomery in 1955. They had five children: Deborah Jane, Susannah Margaret, Sarah Elizabeth, Adam Tudor, and Christopher Montgomery, who have given the Eytons 11 grandchildren.

Eyton retired from the Senate on July 12, 2009, upon reaching the mandatory retirement age of 75. He died on February 24, 2019, at the age of 85.

In December 2019, the Toronto Star reported that Eyton died owing millions in income taxes, despite his high profile business career and long-term senate appointment.

== See also ==
- List of Ontario senators
