= Peter Bronfman =

Canadian businessman and entrepreneur

- Born: 2 October 1929; Montreal, Quebec
- Died: 1 December 1996 (aged 67); Toronto, Ontario
- Relatives: Edward Bronfman, brother Samuel Bronfman, uncle

Peter Frederick Bronfman OC (October 2, 1929 – December 1, 1996) was a Canadian businessman and entrepreneur, born in Montreal, and member of the Toronto branch of Canada's wealthy Bronfman family. He attended Selwyn House School in Montreal and the elite Lawrenceville School in New Jersey, one of the oldest prep schools in America, and received his bachelor's degree from Yale University in 1952.

== Career ==
Peter Frederick Bronfman was born in Montreal in 1929, a son of Allan Bronfman and nephew of Samuel Bronfman, the founder of the Seagram Company. He attended the Lawrenceville School in Lawrenceville, N.J., and received a bachelor's degree from Yale University in 1952. Bronfman was the co-founder (with his brother, Edward Bronfman) of Edper Investments, their private holding company that at its peak was estimated to control $100 billion in assets, including some of the largest corporations in Canada. He and his brother also owned the Montreal Canadiens from 1971 to 1978, winning four Stanley Cups with the team in 1973, 1976, 1977, and 1978. Bronfman also owned Labatt Brewing Company which owned the Toronto Blue Jays when they won their World Series titles in 1992 and 1993.

== Personal life and legacy ==
On November 14, 1996, Bronfman was made an Officer of the Order of Canada. It was presented posthumously in 1997.

Bronfman died of cancer on December 1, 1996. He was survived by his third wife, Lynda Hamilton Bronfman; and three children, Linda Bronfman, Brenda Bronfman, and Bruce Bronfman.

York University's Schulich School of Business in Toronto, Canada has its business library named after him.

The Chang School of Continuing Education at Toronto Metropolitan University houses the Peter Bronfman Learning Centre, which is located on the seventh floor of the Heaslip House.
