= Brookfield Asset Management =

Canadian-American asset management company

Brookfield Asset Management Ltd.
- Type: Public
- Traded as: NYSE: BAM; Russell 1000 component; TSX: BAM; S&P/TSX 60 component
- Industry: Asset management
- Founded: 12 December 2022; 3 years ago
- Headquarters: 225 Liberty Street, New York City
- Key people: Connor Teskey (CEO)
- Revenue: ▲$4.82 billion (2025); US$3.98 billion (2024)
- Net income: ▲US$2.40 billion (2025); US$2.11 billion (2024)
- AUM: Over US$1 trillion
- Total assets: ▲US$17.05 billion (2025); US$14.16 billion (2024)
- Total equity: ▼US$8.91 billion (2025); US$9.09 billion (2024)
- Number of employees: 5,800+ asset-management professionals; c. 250,000 operating employees (2025)
- Website: bam.brookfield.com

Brookfield Asset Management Ltd. is the US-based subsidiary of Canadian-based asset manager, Brookfield Corporation. The company was founded in December 2022 as a spin-off of the asset management operations of Brookfield Corporation, and manages investments across real estate, infrastructure, renewable energy, private equity, and credit markets globally. Brookfield Asset Management is run by CEO Connor Teskey, who succeeded Bruce Flatt in February 2026.

The company's managed assets value over US$1 trillion as of 2025, making it one of the world's largest investment firms. At its inception, the company was headquartered in Toronto, and in December 2024 transferred its headquarters to New York City. Brookfield Asset Management is 73 per cent owned by Brookfield Corporation.

== History ==
On May 12, 2022, Brookfield announced that it would spin off its asset management business into a new publicly traded company worth US$80 billion. Three months earlier, Brookfield had hinted at the idea of separating its operations. In the announcement by chief executive Bruce Flatt, which was made in his quarterly letter to shareholders, he stated that "the bottom line is that today's Brookfield consists of two businesses that are very different in nature but work together very well. Looking forward, we believe that each of these businesses has incredible potential to expand further. To achieve this growth, however, we have concluded that they should now be separated, while preserving the benefits of their complementary nature and alignment." The existing company, then called Brookfield Asset Management, would be renamed Brookfield Corporation, while the spin-off would use the Brookfield Asset Management name. At the time of the spin off, Brookfield Corporation would own 75 per cent of the share of the new company, and 25 per cent would be released to the public. The decision added a further layer to one of the world's most complex corporations. In a profile of the company in the Financial Times, Mark Vandevelde described Brookfield as "not so much a company as a giant, triangular jigsaw board that spreads across the world and covers assets worth $500bn."

In August 2022, Brookfield announced that the chairman of the spin off would be former Bank of Canada and Bank of England governor Mark Carney. Bruce Flatt, chief executive of Brookfield, would be chief executive of the new company, while Connor Teskey would serve as president. Teskey had joined Brookfield in 2012, and in the fall of 2020 was made chief executive of Brookfield Renewable Partners. When Flatt recruited Carney to join Brookfield in 2020 as vice-chairman and head of transition investing, Flatt sold the banker partly on the opportunity to work with Teskey.

The new Brookfield Asset Management began trading on December 12, 2022.

In March 2023, BAM purchased the remaining 50 per cent of Spanish solar developer X-ELIO, whose equity was valued at $2 billion. Also in the first quarter of 2023, BAM raised its stake in Oaktree Capital Management to 68 per cent. In June 2023, BAM acquired Middle Eastern credit card processor Network International for £2.2 billion. That same month, the company acquired American Equity Investment Life for $4.3 billion.

In the summer of 2023, BAM partnered with Sequoia Heritage to form Pinegrove Capital to invest in venture capital-backed companies. Each partner would contribute $250 million, and the company hoped to raise $2 billion. In April 2024, BAM entered talks to buy a majority stake in Castlelake, an aircraft leasing company, for $1.5 billion. In 2023, BAM had raised $61 billion of investment capital by September, with and added $26 billion in the third quarter alone. The company suggested it would attempt to raise $150 billion in the 2023 calendar year. Flatt stated that "most of the way to that $150 billion is very visible through insurance and flagship strategies."

In 2024, Brookfield Asset Management entered into an agreement with Microsoft to develop around 10.5 gigawatts of new renewable energy capacity to build new wind and solar farms.

In March 2024, the company announced that Hadley Peer Marshall would succeed Bahir Manios as chief financial officer. By the summer of 2024, the company announced that it was nearing $1 trillion of assets under administration. In the third quarter of 2024, BAM collected $21 billion in capital, which put its assets over the $1 trillion mark.

In September 2024, according to the Globe and Mail, while Brookfield chair Mark Carney was an economic adviser to then prime minister Justin Trudeau, Brookfield asked for $50 billion from pension and government funds to invest in Canadian assets.

In September 2024, BAM suggested it might move its headquarters to the United States in an effort to be included in more American stock market indexes. Two months later, the company announced the move from Toronto to New York City. The move was part of a wider restructuring, whereby BAM would acquire 100 per cent of the Brookfield group's asset management operations by acquiring the 73 per cent stake in the company held by Brookfield Corporation.

On 23 September 2024, Brookfield Asset Management announced that it had raised $2.4 billion for its Catalytic Transition Fund (CTF), which is supported by the United Arab Emirates to enhance climate finance in emerging markets. Launched at COP28 in Dubai in December 2023, the fund was anchored by a $1 billion commitment from ALTERRA, a UAE-based climate fund with a goal of attracting $250 billion in investments by 2030. Notable investors for CTF included Caisse de dépôt et placement du Québec, Prudential plc, and Temasek and GIC.

In October 2024, Brookfield Asset Management outbid Segro to acquire European property company Tritax EuroBox for US$1.44 billion, including debt.

On January 16, 2025, Carney stepped down as chairman to run in the 2025 Liberal Party of Canada leadership election. Carney was succeeded as chairman by Flatt.

In February 2025, Brookfield Asset Management acquired Chemelex from nVent Electric for $1.7 billion.

On October 6, 2025, Brookfield announced a deal to acquire gas assets—Firstgas, Rockgas, and Flexgas—from Clarus Group for roughly ~NZ$2 billion.

On 3 February 2026, Flatt stepped down as chief executive and was replaced by Connor Teskey. Flatt remains chairman of the board as well as chief executive and chairman of Brookfield Corporation. The move was part of a long-anticipated succession that would see Teskey take over from Flatt as head of the entire Brookfield empire.

In July 2026, Brookfield and CPP Investments agreed to acquire LXP Industrial Trust in an all-cash transaction valued at approximately US$5.2 billion, including debt and preferred equity. LXP's portfolio comprised about 53 million square feet (4.9 million square metres) across 108 industrial properties, primarily in the Sun Belt and Midwestern United States. The transaction was expected to close in the fourth quarter of 2026, after which LXP would become privately held.

== Controversies ==
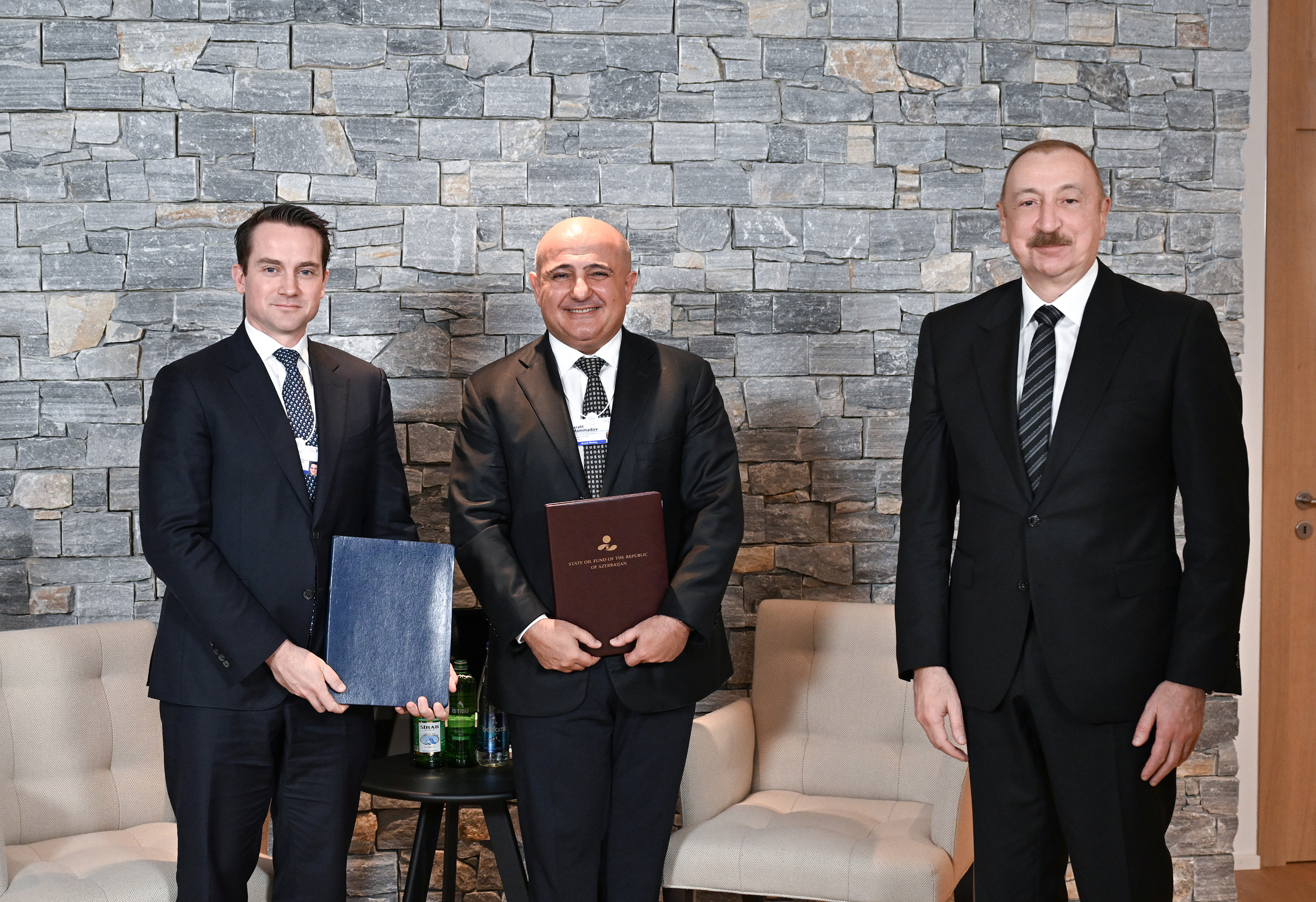
Connor Teskey, President of Brookfield Asset Management, at the 2026 WEF meeting with Ilham Aliyev, President of Azerbaijan, and representative from SOFAZ

=== Tax avoidance ===
The Centre for International Corporate Tax Accountability and Research released a report in June 2023, which criticized Brookfield's lack of transparency and tax avoidance. In 2025, it was reported several entities of Brookfield Asset Management were registered to an address in Bermuda that also housed a bicycle shop. Former chair, Mark Carney, defended Brookfield's tax structure during his run for prime minister in the 2025 Canadian federal election. The New Democratic Party estimated Canadians lost an estimated $5.3 billion in revenue due to Brookfield Asset Management’s tax avoidance between 2021 and 2024 when Mark Carney was at the company.

=== Carbon neutral claims ===
In February 2021, Mark Carney, Vice chairman and Head of Impact Investing and ex Governor of the Bank of England, had to retract an earlier claim that the $600 billion Brookfield Asset Management portfolio was carbon neutral. He based his claim on the fact that Brookfield has a large renewable energy portfolio and “all the avoided emissions that come with that”. The claim was criticized as an accounting trick, as avoided emissions do not counteract the emissions from investments in coal and other fossil fuels responsible for a carbon footprint of about 5,200 metric tons of carbon dioxide. The company is actually aiming to be net-zero by 2050.

== Finances ==
For the fiscal year 2018, Brookfield Asset Management reported earnings of US$3.584 billion, with an annual revenue of $56.771 billion, an increase of 39.2% over the previous fiscal cycle. Brookfield Asset Management’s shares traded at over $38 per share, and its market capitalization was valued at over $40.8 billion in November 2018.

Brookfield Asset Management’s shares traded at $32.71 per share, and its market capitalization was valued at over $54.23 billion on October 17, 2023

Year	Revenue (mil. USD$)	Net income (mil. USD$)	Total assets (mil. USD$)	Price per share (USD$)
2005	5,256	1,662	26,058	7.61
2006	6,897	1,170	40,708	12.17
2007	9,343	787	55,597	16.74
2008	12,868	649	53,611	13.22
2009	12,082	454	61,902	9.33
2010	13,623	3,195	78,131	13.76
2011	15,921	3,674	91,030	16.72
2012	18,697	2,747	108,644	18.69
2013	20,830	3,844	112,745	22.42
2014	18,364	2,956	129,480	27.22
2015	19,913	2,207	139,514	32.47
2016	24,411	1,518	159,826	32.10
2017	40,786	1,317	192,720	38.17
2022	56,771	3,584	256,281	

== Leadership ==
=== Chief Executive Officer ===
- James Bruce Flatt, 12 December 2022 – 4 February 2026
- Connor David Teskey, 3 February 2026 – present

=== President ===
- Connor David Teskey, 12 December 2022 – 3 February 2026

=== Chairman of the Board ===
- Mark Joseph Carney, 12 December 2022 – 16 January 2025
- James Bruce Flatt, 16 January 2025 – present
