= Union of Jewish congregations of Latin America and the Caribbean =

The Union of Jewish congregations of Latin America and the Caribbean is a group of 12 small non-Orthodox Jewish communities in Latin America and the Caribbean, established in 1997. Currently, the President is Richard Stanley, the Vice-President is Phil Gelman, the Minister for the Presidency is René Levy Maduro, and the Executive Director is Kullock Joshua. They largely emphasize respect, equality between men and women, and education.

The group met in San José, Costa Rica in 2007 to establish an advocacy network for small isolated communities.
