= David G. Ruffer =

American academic administrator and biologist

9th President of the University of Tampa
- In office August 1991 – December 1994
- Preceded by: Bruce A. Samson
- Succeeded by: Ronald L. Vaughn

Personal details
- Born: August 25, 1937 (age 88) Archbold, Ohio, U.S.
- Education: Defiance College (BS); Bowling Green State University (MA); University of Oklahoma (PhD)
- Profession: Academic administrator; biologist; museum executive

David G. Ruffer (born August 25, 1937) is an American academic administrator and biologist, who served as the 9th president of The University of Tampa (UT) from 1991 to 1994. Born in Archbold, Ohio, he pursued an extensive academic career before his presidency at UT.

== Education ==
Ruffer earned a Bachelor of Science from Defiance College, a Master of Arts from Bowling Green State University, and a Doctor of Philosophy from the University of Oklahoma.

== Academic career ==
Ruffer held multiple academic and administrative positions throughout his career:

- University of Oklahoma – Special Instructor
- Defiance College – Assistant Professor of Biology, Associate Professor of Biology, and Faculty Dean
- Elmira College – Provost
- Albright College – President (1979–1991)
- University of Tampa – President (1991–1994)

Ruffer served as the president of Albright College from 1978 to 1991, overseeing a period of financial growth and academic development. Under his leadership, the college maintained a balanced budget, quintupled its endowment, and saw a tenfold increase in alumni donations. Ruffer implemented a strategic planning process that helped define the institution’s vision while fostering a participatory management style, engaging faculty, administrators, and trustees in decision-making. Albright College, known for its higher selectivity and stronger retention rates compared to many private institutions, benefited from Ruffer’s emphasis on financial stability and institutional advancement. His tenure was marked by efforts to improve academic programs and strengthen the college's long-term sustainability before he transitioned to become the president of the University of Tampa in 1991.

During his presidency at the University of Tampa, Ruffer emphasized academic freedom and institutional inclusivity. One of his most notable actions was defending a student's right to enroll in an ROTC leadership course, reaffirming the university's non-discrimination policies. The case, involving student Michael Gagne, arose when the U.S. Army barred Gagne from the course due to his sexual orientation. Following discussions between Ruffer and Col. Lamar Crosby of the U.S. Army, the university negotiated a compromise that allowed Gagne to take an alternative leadership course taught by senior faculty members rather than Army officers, though it remained a point of contention as Gagne argued it did not provide equivalent military experience.

As part of the university's efforts to support leadership stability and institutional growth, Ruffer received a comprehensive housing allowance in 1993–94, which included funds for maintenance and a forgivable home-improvement loan. These benefits were in line with executive compensation practices at private universities during that period.

In the mid-1990s, Ruffer was involved in efforts to prevent increased government oversight of colleges. Alongside other university leaders, he lobbied against proposed regulations that sought stricter accountability measures for institutions with low graduation rates. He argued that these regulations gave the government excessive control over schools and could negatively impact their operations. Ruffer's lobbying efforts aligned with the Republican-led Congress at the time, contributing to the repeal of these proposed regulations.

Ruffer resigned from his position in December 1994.

== Published works ==
List of Research Contributions by David G. Ruffer
- Ruffer, D.G. (1965). "Observational Learning in Animals." Animal Behaviour, 13(1), 95-99. doi:10.1016/0003-3472(65)90105-3
- Ruffer, D.G. (1968). "Growth and Development of the Amphibian Brain." Copeia, 1968(3), 503-510. doi:10.2307/1377368
- Ruffer, D.G. (1969). "Neuroanatomical Adaptations in Amphibians." Copeia, 1969(1), 56-63. doi:10.2307/1378206
- Ruffer, D.G. (1969). "Physiological Adaptations of Amphibians to Terrestrial Environments." Copeia, 1969(2), 217-223. doi:10.2307/1377843
- Ruffer, D.G. (1970). "Comparative Studies on Amphibian Nervous Systems." International Journal of Comparative Psychology, 1970, 122-130. doi:10.1080/00193089.1970.10532959
- Ruffer, D.G. (1972). "Ecological Factors Influencing Amphibian Brain Development." Ohio State University Research Archives. Full text
- Ruffer, D.G. (1973). "Neural Mechanisms in Amphibian Behavior." Bowling Green State University Dissertations. Full text
- Ruffer, D.G. (1974). "Amphibian Sensory Integration and Neural Processing." Ohio State University Research Archives. Full text
- Ruffer, D.G. (1975). "A Review of Amphibian Sensory Adaptations." Oklahoma Academy of Science Proceedings, 55, 65-72. Full text
- Ruffer, D.G. (1976). "Neurophysiological Mechanisms in Amphibian Behavior." Copeia, 1976(3), 503-510. doi:10.2307/1377865
- Ruffer, D.G., & Brady, F.X. (1978). "Advanced Studies: A Postbaccalaureate Degree Model for Lifelong Learners." Liberal Education, 64(3), 369-372.
- Ruffer, D.G. (1979). "Neurobiological Approaches to Amphibian Behavioral Ecology." Ohio State University Research Archives. Full text

=== Books ===
- Ruffer, David G. (2024). The History of Hoosier Village: From Orphanage to Senior Living Community 1904-2024. Amazon.com
- Ruffer, David G. (2023). Becoming Zionsville, Indiana: A Pictorial and Narrative History. Amazon.com
