= List of Middle East Technical University rectors =

Below is the list of rectors of the Middle East Technical University in Turkey. The founding director of METU was Thomas Godfrey. The founding rector of Middle East Technical University was Prof. Willis Raymond Woolrich, an academic who served as a dean at the University of Texas for 25 years. Edwin S. Burdell, who served as president of the Cooper Union for 22 years and was the first dean of the School of Humanities and Social Sciences at the Massachusetts Institute of Technology, also served as a president at METU. The first Turkish rector was Turhan Feyzioğlu. The incumbent rector is Ahmet Yozgatlıgil.

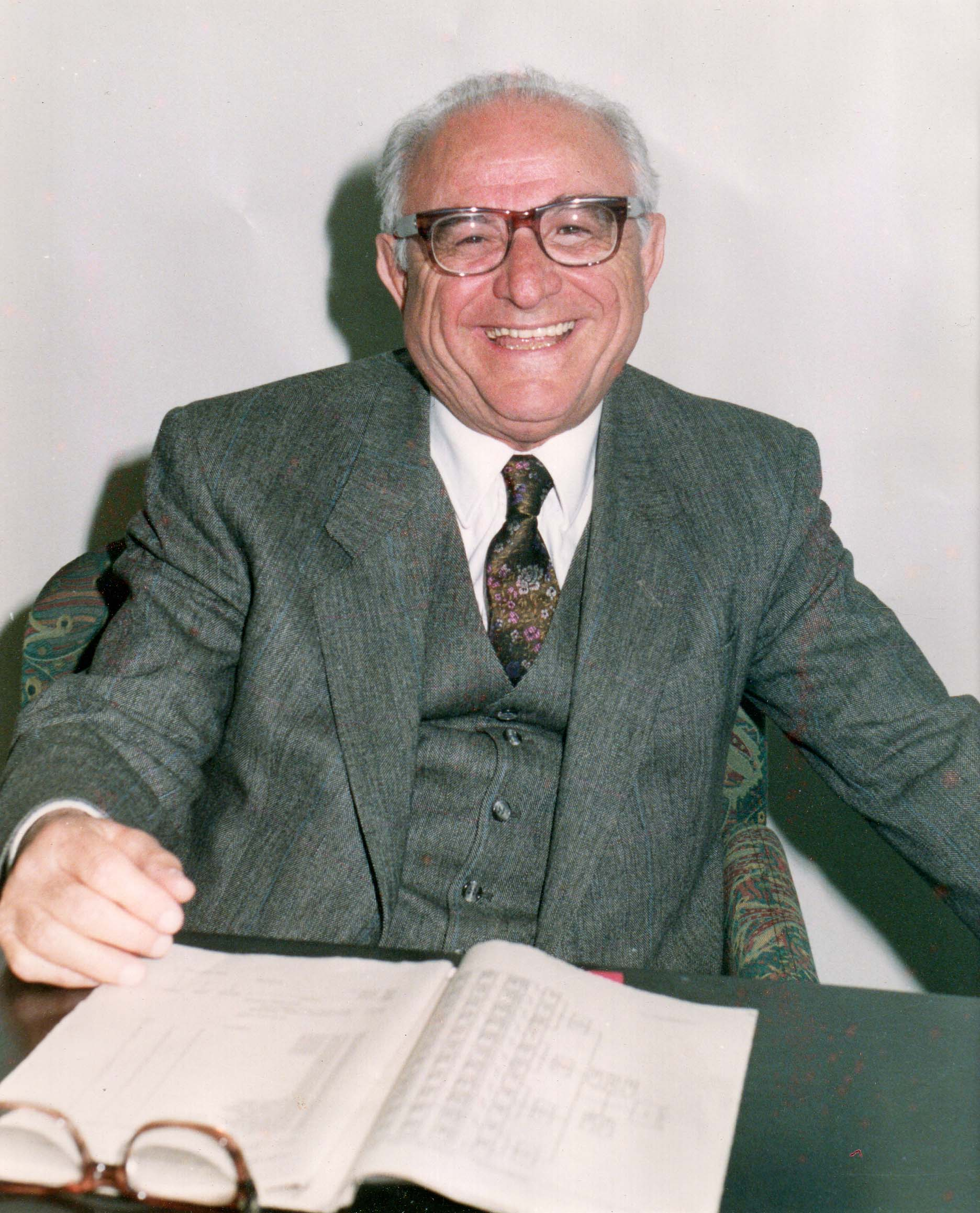
Kemal Kurdaş initiated the creation of Ankara campus for Middle East Technical University and a large forest around it on what was barren land.

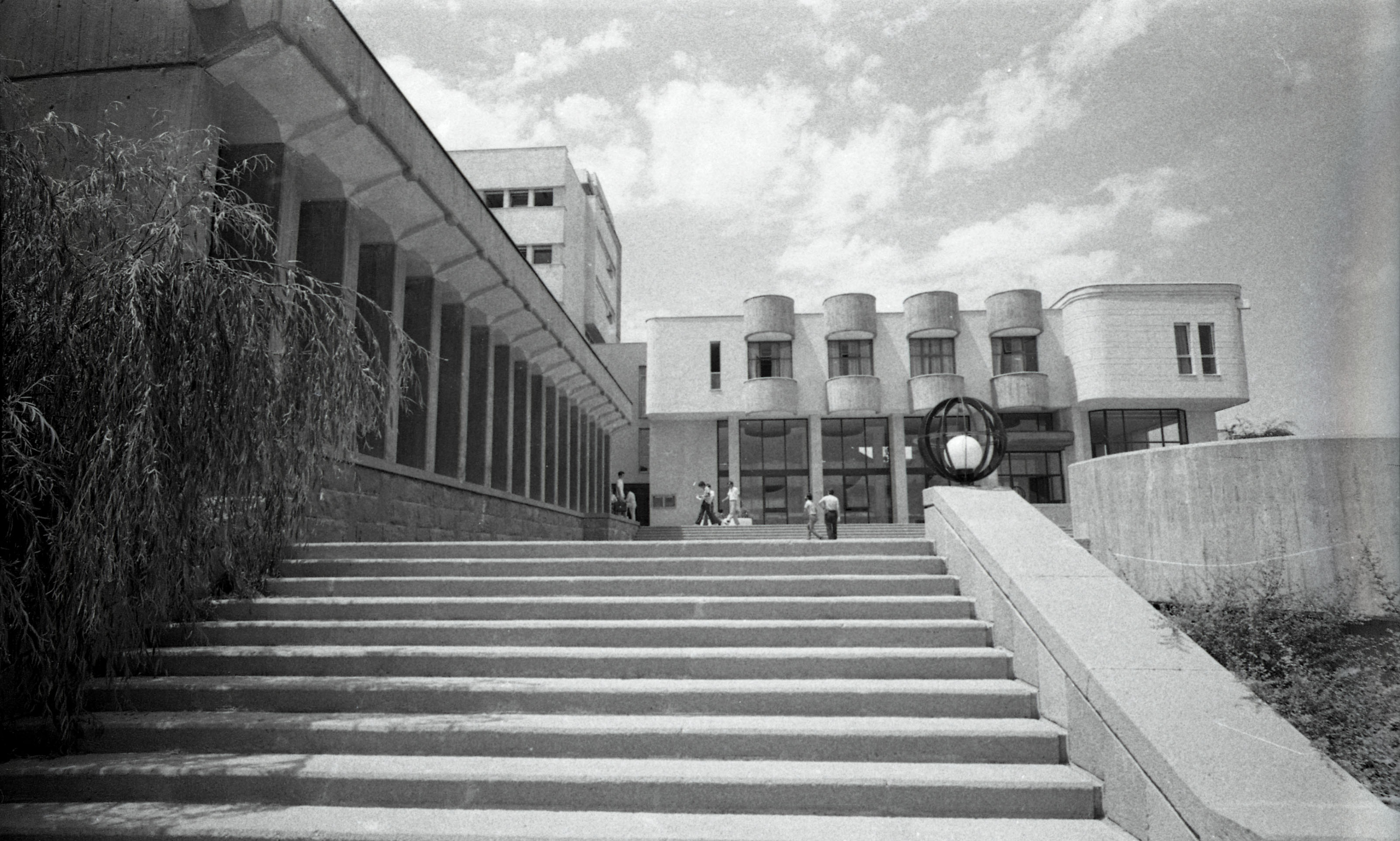
METU Rectorate Building, stairs going up to the entrance courtyard, 1961-1980, SALT Research

Rector (president)	Duration
Thomas Godfrey	15.11.1956 – 15.11.1958
Willis Raymond Woolrich	15.11.1958 – 11.01.1960
Edwin S. Burdell	11.01.1960 – 17.08.1960
Turhan Feyzioğlu	17.08.1960 – 08.02.1961
Seha Meray	23.02.1961 – 05.08.1961
Kemal Kurdaş	20.11.1961 – 30.11.1969
Erdal İnönü	11.09.1970 – 09.03.1971
Şefik Erensü	04.06.1971 – 23.03.1971
İsmet Ordemir	01.04.1971 – 01.04.1974
Tarık Somer	01.04.1974 – 01.05.1976
Ilgaz Alyanak	05.04.1976 – 12.02.1977
Hasan Tan	14.02.1977 – 05.10.1977
Nuri Saryal	05.10.1977 – 25.06.1979
Mehmet Kıcıman	25.06.1979 – 31.07.1982
Mehmet Gönlübol	01.08.1982 – 31.07.1987
Ömer Saatçioğlu	01.08.1987 – 19.08.1992
Süha Sevük	20.08.1992 – 06.08.2000
Ural Akbulut	07.08.2000 – 05.08.2008
Ahmet Acar	06.08.2008 – 28.07.2016
Mustafa Verşan Kök	01.08.2016 – 16.08.2024
Ahmet Yozgatlıgil	16.08.2024 –
