= Presidents of Cooper Union =

Head of Cooper Union

President of Cooper Union
- Incumbent; Malcolm King (Interim) since September 3, 2024
- Appointer: Cooper Union Board of Trustees
- Formation: 1859
- First holder: Peter Cooper
- Website: Office of the President

The president of Cooper Union is the chief administrator of Cooper Union.

== History ==
The Cooper Union for the Advancement of Science and Art was founded in 1859 by industrialist, inventor and philanthropist Peter Cooper. From its inception, the college committed to providing full scholarships, regardless of need, to its students.

== List of presidents of the Cooper Union ==
The following persons have served as president of the Cooper Union:

No.	Image	President	Term start	Term end	Ref.
1		Peter Cooper	1859	1882	
2		Edward Cooper	1882	1904	
3		John Edward Parsons	1905	1914	
4		Robert Fulton Cutting	1914	September 21, 1934 (Note: Died in office)	
5		Gano Dunn	February 1, 1935	June 30, 1951	
6		Edwin S. Burdell	July 1, 1951	February 28, 1960 (Note: Resigned to lead the Middle East Technical University at Ankara, Turkey.)	
acting		Johnson E. Fairchild	March 1, 1960	May 31, 1961	
7		Richard Franklin Humphreys	June 1, 1961	August 8, 1968	
acting		Henry Heald	August 9, 1968	May 31, 1969	
8		John F. White	June 1, 1969	1980	
9		Bill N. Lacy	1980	1987	
10		John Jay Iselin	July 1, 1988	June 30, 2000	
11		George Campbell Jr.	July 1, 2000	June 30, 2011	
12		Jamshed Bharucha	July 1, 2011	June 30, 2015	
acting		William Mea	July 1, 2015	January 3, 2017	
13		Laura Sparks	January 4, 2017	August 2024	
acting		Malcolm King	August 2024	June 30, 2025	
14		Steven W. McLaughlin	July 1, 2025	present	

Table notes:
