= Bruce A. Samson =

American businessman and university administrator

Bruce Adams Samson

8th President of the University of Tampa
- In office 1986 – July 1991
- Preceded by: Richard D. Cheshire
- Succeeded by: David G. Ruffer

Personal details
- Born: January 1, 1938 Tampa, Florida, United States
- Died: October 14, 2017 (aged 79) St. Petersburg, Florida, United States
- Spouse: Adajean Samson
- Children: Ansley, Amanda, Catherine
- Education: Sewanee: The University of the South (B.A., 1959); Harvard Business School (M.B.A., 1961)
- Occupation: Businessman; University administrator; Investment banker

Bruce Adams Samson (1938 – October 14, 2017) was an American businessman and university administrator who served as the eighth president of the University of Tampa from 1986 to 1991. He successfully eliminated the university's budget deficit and oversaw major campus renovations during his tenure.

== Early life and education ==
Samson was born in 1938 in Tampa, Florida, attending Ballast Point Elementary School and H.B. Plant High School. At Sewanee: The University of the South, he earned a Bachelor of Arts degree in political science in 1959, graduating magna cum laude and earning membership in Phi Beta Kappa and Omicron Delta Kappa. He served as student body president, fraternity president, and swim team captain. He received his Master of Business Administration from Harvard Business School in 1961, specializing in finance and taxation.

== Business career ==
After working briefly in the trucking business, Samson became an investment banker specializing in corporate and public finance. He was a registered financial principal and allied member of the New York Stock Exchange. From 1979 to 1986, he served on the governing board of the Southwest Florida Water Management District, serving as chairman for six years. He was also executive vice president with H.G. Nix Inc. securities firm.

== University of Tampa presidency ==
Samson was initially hired as interim president in 1986, with the interim designation removed in 1987. He inherited a $1.4 million budget deficit and reversed it to a surplus within one year through cost-cutting measures, including withdrawing from NCAA Division I sports. Upon his departure, the university provided him with a severance package that included at least $124,000.

During his presidency, Samson served as chairman of the Independent Colleges and Universities of Florida, member of the President's Commission of the National Collegiate Athletic Association, and president of the Sunshine State Athletic Conference.

He oversaw restoration of Plant Hall's minarets and domes, and established the university's college structure in 1987 with the College of Business, followed by the College of Liberal Arts and Sciences and School of Continuing Studies in 1990. During his tenure, the university also hosted a notable visit by Queen Elizabeth II and Prince Philip in May 1991, with festivities held in Plant Hall's Fletcher Lounge.

Samson left in July 1991, stating he had "achieved and exceeded goals" set almost five years earlier. He was succeeded by David G. Ruffer, who served as the ninth president from 1991 to 1994.

== Community involvement ==
Samson held numerous leadership positions in Tampa Bay organizations, including chairman of the Tampa Sports Authority, vice-chairman of Tampa Bay International Terminals, and trustee of the Tampa Bay Performing Arts Center. He was a founding member of the Tampa Bay Committee on Foreign Relations and Tampa Bay World Trade Center. In 1992, he served as king of Ye Mystic Krewe of Gasparilla.

== Personal life and death ==
Samson received an honorary doctorate from The University of the South in 1990. He was married to Adajean and had three daughters. He died peacefully at home on October 14, 2017, after an extended illness at age 79.

== Legacy ==
Samson's presidency stabilized the University of Tampa financially and academically. His creation of the college structure became a lasting organizational feature, and his restoration of Plant Hall preserved one of Tampa's architectural landmarks.
