= John F. White =

American academic administrator (1917–2005)

John F. White (October 11, 1917 – April 22, 2005) was an academic administrator, president of National Educational Television, and president of the Cooper Union.

== Early life and career ==
White was born on October 11, 1917, in Waukegan, Illinois, to the Reverend Edward Sydney and Lilah McCormick White. He was educated at the Harvard School for Boys and Hyde Park High School and went on to receive his B.A. from Lawrence College in Appleton, Wisconsin in 1941. He married Joan Glasow in May 1943 with whom he had three children: Susan, Michael, and Christopher. In 1944, he received his master's degree at the University of Chicago.

From 1941 to 1944, White was the admissions counsellor at Lawrence. White returned to Illinois in 1944 to become the director of admissions at the Illinois Institute of Technology. White stayed at the Illinois Institute of Technology for six years. He served as assistant dean of students from 1945 to 1946, dean of students from 1946 to 1948, and dean and director of the development program from 1948 to 1950. In 1950, White left the Institute of Technology for Western Reserve University, where he was offered the position of vice president. During his five-year tenure, White made his initial move into educational broadcasting as he pioneered development of television as an educational tool at Western Reserve.

He left his job as vice president in 1955 to move to Pittsburgh, Pennsylvania, and to become the general manager of WQED. During 1956, he lectured at the University of Pittsburgh. WQED won the Peabody Award for its programming in 1957. White left WQED in 1958 to become President of the National Educational Television and Radio Center. During his tenure as president, there were a few unsuccessful attempts to bring educational television to the New York City area. White helped form Educational Television for the Metropolitan Area Inc. in 1961 and served as its secretary and as a board member to further this goal. In 1962, WNDT New York went on the air, becoming one of the country's outstanding ETV operations by 1968.

In 1963, the National Educational Television and Radio Center put aside all its functions except for non-instructional television programming. It changed its name to National Educational Television and focused on cultural and public affairs programming. John White served as president of the National Educational Television and Radio Center from 1963 to 1969. During this period White received several honorary degrees, including an LH.D. from Lawrence College in 1961 and a LL.D. from Cornell College in Iowa in 1964.

== Cooper Union ==
After eleven years in public broadcasting, White returned to education in 1969 to serve as President of the Cooper Union for the Advancement of Science and Art. His time at Cooper Union included two administrative restructuring orders which included the elimination of all divisions within the various schools as well as the termination of undergraduate degrees in mathematics and physics, as well as the reassignment of some faculty to a new school of Liberal Arts and Sciences. In 1975, the faculty voted to censure White, asserting that he was interfering with the Academic Freedom and Tenure Committee. White responded by refusing to call any faculty meetings for the remainder of his presidency. During this time the faculty formed a union affiliated with the American Federation of Teachers, which completed its first contract with the school in 1979.

== Personal life ==
John White and his family lived in Tuxedo Park, NY from 1959 to 1995. Following his time at Cooper Union, he worked as a consultant for the ASPEN Institute from 1980 to 1988 and retired from active work in 1990.

He was very active in his community through directorships in several companies including Orange and Rockland Utilities Inc. and Viacom International Inc. and participation in local clubs such as the Century, Tuxedo Club, and University Clubs. He was also an active church member. He served as Trustee of St. John the Divine in New York City from 1978 to 1988 and as a Vestryman of St. Mary's Church in Tuxedo Park from 1979 to 1986.

In 1995, he and his wife Joan moved to their home in Sarasota, Florida. They remained there until 2001, when they moved to Virginia Beach, VA. White died in Virginia Beach at age 87 on April 22, 2005.

Academic offices
| Preceded by Richard F. Humphreys | President of Cooper Union; 1969—1979 | Succeeded by Bill N. Lacy |
