= John Jay Iselin =

American university president (1933–2008)

- Born: December 8, 1933; Greenville, South Carolina, U.S.
- Died: May 6, 2008 (aged 74); New York City, New York, U.S.
- Occupation(s): journalist, editor, publisher, college president
- Children: 5

John Jay Iselin (December 8, 1933 – May 6, 2008) was an American magazine and television journalist, editor, and publisher. He served as president of WNET, president of the Cooper Union, and president of the Marconi Foundation at Columbia University.

== Early life ==
Iselin was born on December 8, 1933, in Greenville, South Carolina. He was a son of Fanny (née Humphreys) Iselin, and William Jay Iselin, a New York banker who moved his family South, where he owned cotton mills, during the Great Depression. His father died in an airplane crash in Europe in April 1951.

His paternal grandparents were Eleanor (née Jay) Iselin (a daughter of Col. William Jay) and Arthur Iselin (grandson of Adrian Georg Iselin). Through his father, his fourth great-grandfather was United States founding father John Jay, the first Chief Justice of the United States Supreme Court, and through his mother, he was descended from Benjamin Franklin. His maternal grandfather was Richard Duane Humphreys of Barnstable, Mount Kisco, New York.

Iselin was a graduate of St. Mark's School, and Harvard University, where he served as Managing Editor of the Crimson. In 1959, he was selected as a Marshall Scholar, and in 2001 became founding Chairman of the New York Marshall Committee. After Harvard, he went to Cambridge University where he studied law and received a master's degree before returning to Harvard where he earned a Ph.D. in government in 1964.

== Career ==
In the early 1960s, Iselin went to work for Newsweek, covering the U.S. Department of Justice under Robert F. Kennedy before becoming national affairs editor. He then succeeded Cass Canfield Jr. as publisher of the trade division of Harper & Row, before becoming general manager of WNET in 1971. He later became president of WNET in 1973 and served in that role until his resignation in October 1986, remaining at the helm until the board named his successor, William F. Baker.

From 1988 to 2000, Iselin was appointed president of The Cooper Union for the Advancement of Science and Art. During his years as president, "he completed a $50 million capital campaign, created endowed professorships in the schools of art, architecture and engineering and added new trustees and new deans for art and the humanities. In 2000 he became president of the Marconi Foundation, based at Columbia University, which supports innovations in telecommunications." He was also an adjunct faculty member of the Columbia University Graduate School of Journalism.

== Personal life ==
He was married to Josephine Lea Iselin, a partner in the New York law firm of Lankenau, Kovner & Kurtz. For over forty years, he spent his summers in Vinalhaven, Maine, and had a family farm in Ghent, New York. Together, they were the parents of five children; William Jay Iselin, Benjamin Iselin, Josephine Lea Iselin, Fannie Humphreys Iselin, and Alison Jay Iselin.

Iselin died of pneumonia on May 6, 2008, in New York City. At his death, he was survived by five children and thirteen grandchildren.

== Honors ==
Each year, Cooper Union presents the John Jay Iselin Memorial Lecture, which is focused on current events of moment and interest. Recent speakers have included Preet Bharara, Zephyr Teachout, Eric L. Adams and Pete Souza.

Academic offices
Preceded by Bill N. Lacy	President of Cooper Union; 1987–2000	Succeeded by George Campbell Jr.
