= Richard Franklin Humphreys =

American physicist (1911–1968)

Richard F. Humphreys
- Born: May 16, 1922; Greenville, Ohio, United States
- Died: August 8, 1968 (aged 46)
- Education: DePauw University; Syracuse University; Yale University
- Scientific career
- Fields: atomic physics acoustics

Richard Franklin Humphreys (May 16, 1911 – August 8, 1968) was a physicist and President of Cooper Union.

== Early life and career ==
Humphreys was born in Greenville, Ohio and in 1933 earned a bachelor's degree from DePauw University. This was followed by a master's degree in 1936 at Syracuse University and a Ph.D. at Yale University in 1939. He eventually became an associate professor of physics at Yale, where he was the acting director of Yale's Sloane Physics Laboratory and carried out underwater sound research for the US federal government. In 1949, he joined the Armour Research Foundation at the Illinois Institute of Technology and worked in the field of atomic physics.

Together with Robert Beringer, another professor at Yale, in 1950 he was a co-author of the physics textbook First principles of atomic physics.

During his time as Cooper Union's president (1961-1968), the college expanded the school's academic programs. The first degrees in art and architecture were awarded by Cooper Union in 1963, and the master's degree in engineering was also established during his tenure. In 1967, he began planning for the construction of an academic building at 50 Astor Place, but died in 1968 before these plans came to fruition.

Academic offices
Preceded by Edwin S. Burdell	President of Cooper Union; 1961—1968	Succeeded by John F. White
