= Cooper Union financial crisis and tuition protests =

Cooper Union financial scandal and tuition protests
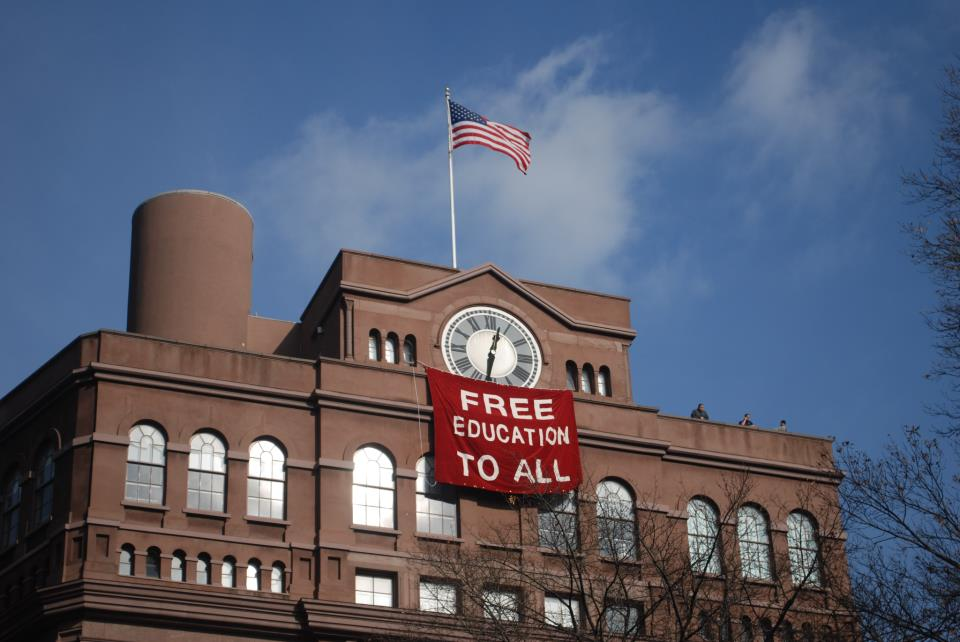
- Students hung a banner from the Cooper Union Foundation Building during a December 2012 occupation
- Location: Cooper Union, 30 Cooper Square; Manhattan, New York City
- Caused by: Implementation of tuition payments for current and future students
- Goals: To keep Cooper Union tuition-free and hold administration accountable
- Status: Ongoing

The Cooper Union financial crisis and tuition protests constitute the events surrounding Cooper Union's announcement that they would begin charging tuition after being a tuition-free school for most of its history. The possible mismanagement of the school's finances and the subsequent reactions of students, faculty, alumni and organized protest groups attracted widespread media attention. Activist groups staged a series of occupations and protests demanding the resignation of the school president, Jamshed Bharucha, promoting a vote of no confidence in Bharucha and the chair of the Board of Trustees, Mark Epstein, both of whom resigned in 2015, and insisting that the administration address the concerns of students, faculty, alumni, and the public, and alternate plans to avoid having the school charging tuition.

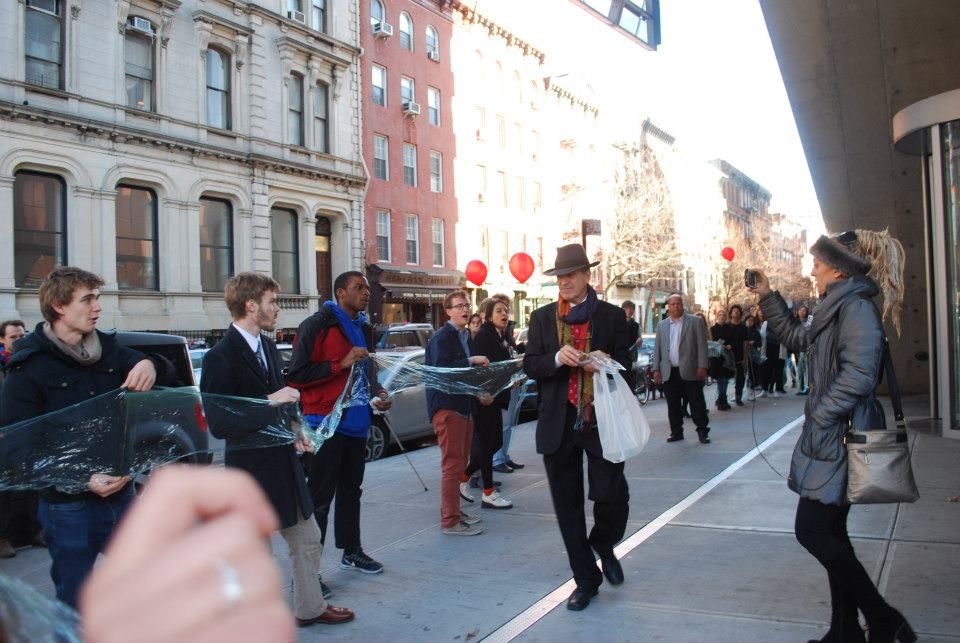
Chairman of the Board Mark Epstein walks out of a closed-door board meeting in December 2012. Students hold Saran Wrap representing their demand for more transparency in the board's past and future actions.

It has been reported that the Cooper Union financial crisis was due to a combination of problems caused by poor fiscal decisions, lack of accountability, the economic recession of the late 2000s, the selling off of the institution's assets, and taking on significant debt due to the 2009 building of 41 Cooper Square, which cost the school US$175 million. In fiscal year 2009 ending in June, Cooper Union's managed assets (including investments in hedge funds) lost 14%, and the value of its endowment in 2013 was lower than it was at the end of fiscal year 2008, even as the Standard & Poor's 500-stock index hit new highs.

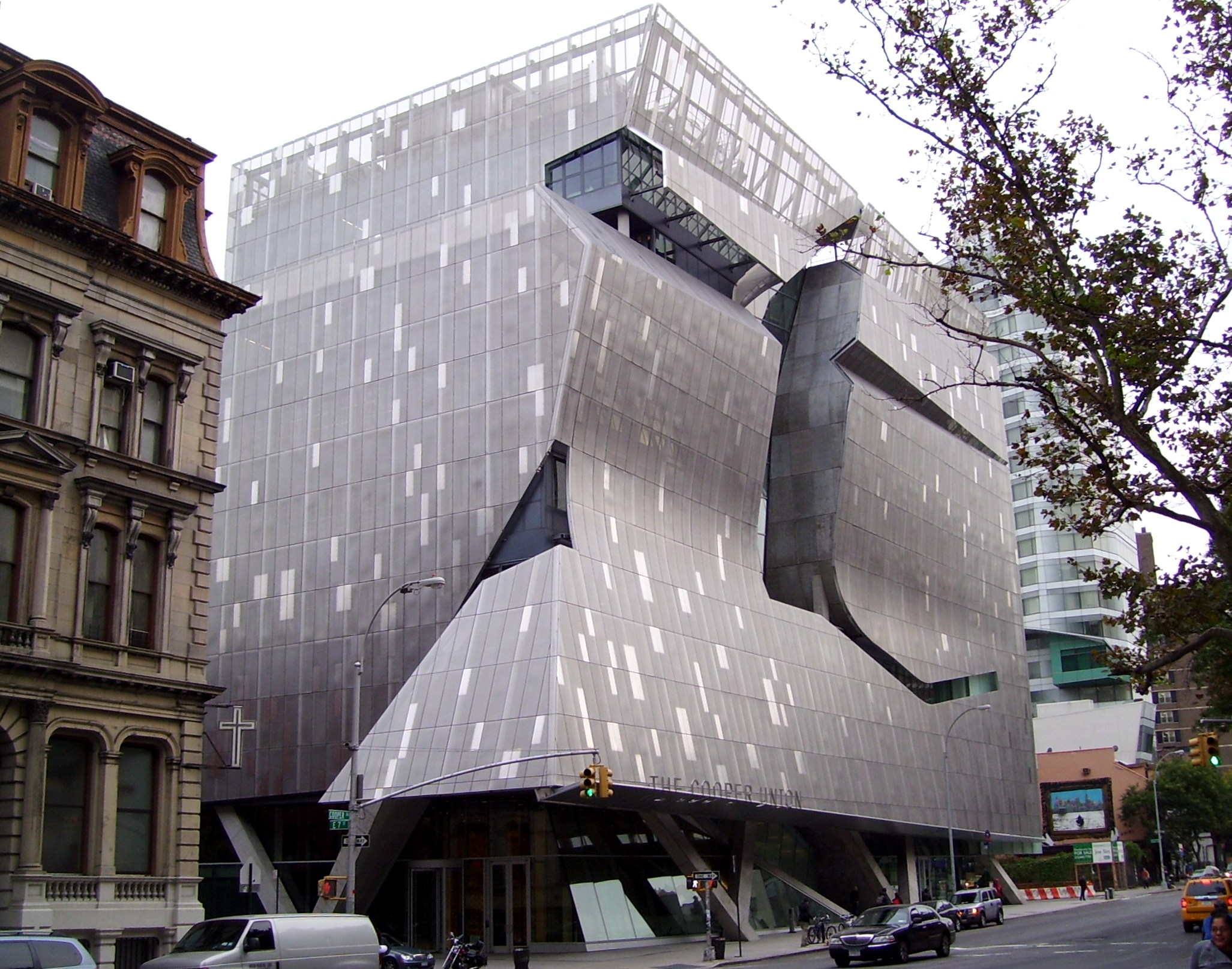
The new Cooper Union Academic Building, completed in 2009, is located at 41 Cooper Square, designed by architect Thom Mayne of Morphosis, and is the newest addition to the campus.

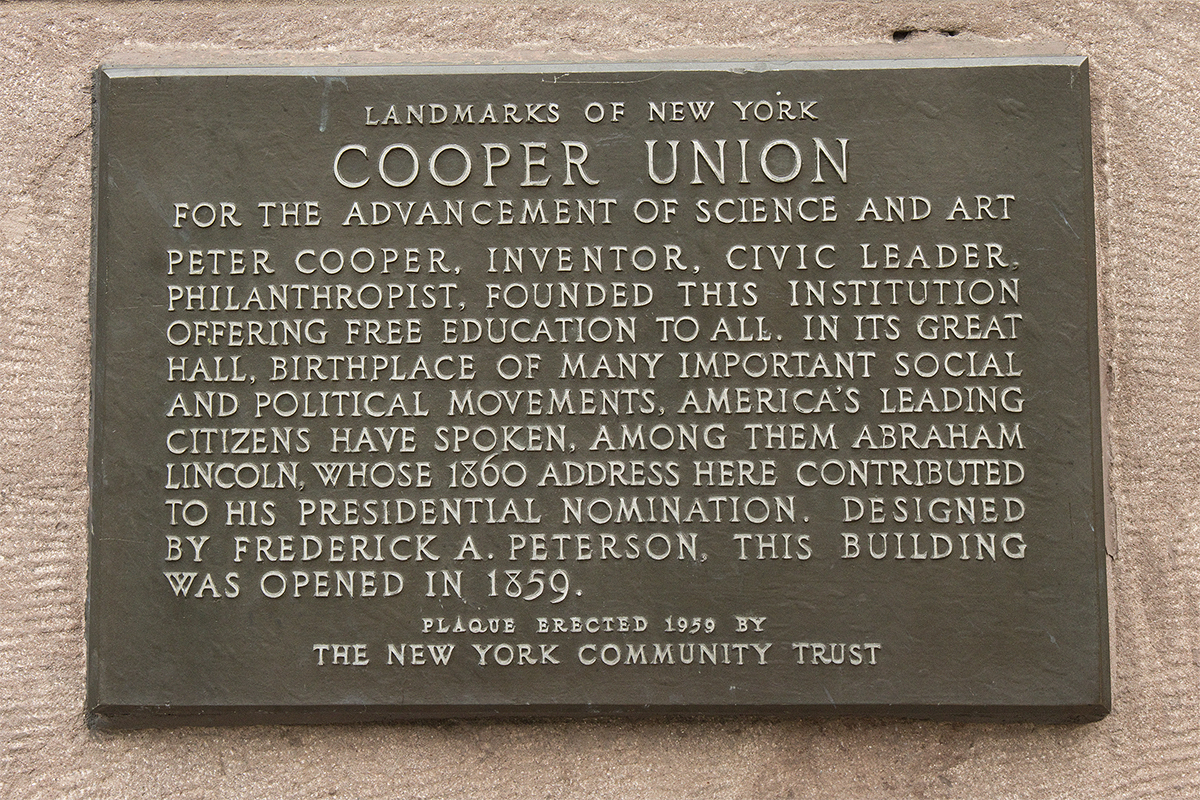
Located on the northwest corner of the Cooper Union Foundation Building at 7 E 7th Street, this plaque is a historical landmark that notes that Cooper Union provides "free education to all"

Cooper Union assessed tuition for the freshman class of 2014, with plans for tuition for future students.

The New York State Attorney General reached an agreement in September 2015 to settle a lawsuit filed by the Committee to Save Cooper Union against the board of trustees. A consent decree, signed by the attorney general and both parties in the lawsuit and pending court approval, outlined additional fiscal and administrative oversight of the school by the attorney general and made provisions for students, alumni, and faculty, who would work with the board of trustees to determine how Cooper Union could return to a tuition-free school.

== Timeline ==
=== 2011 ===
- October: The Cooper Union administration deletes mention of the full-scholarship and history of free education from the school's website.
- October 18: The inauguration of president Jamshed Bharucha takes place, and the literature provided during the main ceremony lacked any mention of "free" or "full-scholarship" in its full history and descriptions of the school. The various speeches also omitted these words, while focusing on other words, such as "global" and "growth".
- October 29: News circulates that the school is in serious financial trouble and the administration indicated that depletion of the school's endowment required additional sources of funding.
- October 31: The Cooper Union administration announces to the public, to The New York Times, and at a student forum that its available funds were vastly depleted. Bharucha announced that the school's annual deficit was around US$16 million.
- October 31: A series of open forums are held with students, faculty, and alumni to address the crisis. In these forums, the administration proposed a possible tuition levy, more focused solicitation of alumni donations, and research grants were all being considered to offset recent financial practices, such as liquidating assets and spending heavily on a controversial new academic building.
- November 2: Bharucha announces a "Reinvention" plan. Walkouts and various protests begin.

=== 2012 ===
- March: Facing the threat of closure, the Cooper Union Art Faculty submits a Reinvention proposal.
- April: The college announces that it would start charging tuition for graduate students in the fall of 2014.
- April 16: Cooper Union students satirize college administration in the press.
- April 26: Two Cooper Union students are arrested during a tuition protest outside the Foundation Building.
- December: As a protest against the possibility of undergraduate tuition being charged, 11 students occupy a suite in the Foundation Building for a week. During the occupation, a protest rally to Washington Square Park and outside the Cooper Union took place.

=== 2013 ===
- April 23: The New York Times reports that the college has announced that it would end its free tuition policy for undergraduates effective Fall 2014, and charge an estimated US$20,000 each year. The administration maintains that they would continue to offer need-based tuition remission to incoming undergraduates on a "sliding scale". Cooper Union announces that its board of trustees would attempt to establish a new tuition-based cross-disciplinary graduate program, expand its fee-based continuing education programs, and charge tuition to some students in its existing graduate programs, effective September 2013.
- May: Students present a Vote of No Confidence document to President Bharucha's Office.
- May 8: A group of students and members of the public occupy Bharucha's office.
- June: Students organize a sit-in in the presidential office after presenting the Vote of No Confidence document. The sit-in turns into an occupation.
- July: The student occupation ends in an agreement negotiated with trustees Michael Borkowsky and Jeff Gural. A working group, composed of trustees, faculty, alumni and students was tasked with preparing an alternative to charging tuition.
- August: Teresa Dahlberg is appointed dean of the School of Engineering. The vice president of finance, T. C. Westcott, and the dean of students, Linda Lemiez, both resign.
- September: The Free Cooper Union group hosts a freshman "Disorientation" to inform incoming students about its views on the recent financial crisis.
- October 12: During his month-long Better Out Than In "residency on the streets of New York", British artist Banksy paints "Concrete Confessional" in a pre-cast concrete structure stored near the entrance of 41 Cooper Square. Overnight, the piece is "transformed by an anonymous, unauthorized collaborator into a visual statement of opposition to the administration" of Cooper Union, by the addition of a Peter Cooper-style beard to the priest, and a portrait of a penitent Jamshed Bharucha, the Cooper Union president, in the structure adjacent to the Banksy piece. "Free Cooper: The Musical" was added to a third structure, a homage to another work in Banksy's October series.
- November Administrators show members of the student government a draft of the school's new code of conduct, which, aside from addressing fire safety and drug use, would forbid "deliberate or knowing disruption of the free flow of pedestrian traffic on Cooper Union premises" and "behavior that disturbs the peace, academic study or sleep of others on or off campus". A section on bullying notes communication, in any medium, that "disrupts or interferes with the orderly operation of the Cooper Union".
- December During the trustees' meeting to review the working group proposal, newly elected chairman, Richard Lincer, said the board must "give the proposals contained in the report the serious and rigorous review and analysis that they warrant", and that they would meet again the following month for a final decision.

=== 2014 ===
- January 7: With the tuition decision looming, former trustee Michael Borkowsky, who was one of the trustees who brokered the deal with the students to end occupation, urged the trustees to consider the risks of the tuition plan, which he holds are greater than the risks of the working group plan.
- January 11: After taking an additional month to review the working group plan, the trustees noted that "the Working Group plan puts forward a number of recommendations that are worth pursuing under any financial model. However, we believe that the contingencies and risks inherent in the proposals are too great to supplant the need for new revenue sources. Regrettably, tuition remains the only realistic source of new revenue in the near future". Trustee Jeff Gural also proposed a plan in which he would make a large donation to offset the revenue lost from not charging tuition for a year, keeping the school tuition free for another year. This plan was also rejected by the board.
- February Bharucha announces that Teresa Dahlberg will become chief academic officer in addition to her continued responsibilities as dean of the engineering school.
- May 27: The Committee to Save Cooper Union files a lawsuit In New York Supreme Court to block Cooper Union from charging tuition and petitions the court for formation of "The Associates of Cooper Union", as required by the Cooper Union charter. The Associates would serve as a check on the board of trustees since the Associates' elected Council could remove Trustees by majority vote. They petition the court for an audit to review the history of fiscal transactions, including any potential mismanagement, by the Cooper Union administration. The Committee also launches an IndieGogo campaign to raise US$150,000 for its legal battle against Cooper Union.
- May 28: At an outdoor press conference at Cooper Union, leaders of The Committee to Save Cooper Union and Richard Emery, its legal representative from Emery, Celli, Brinckerhoff, & Abady, outline grievances, including their claims of fiscal mismanagement, against the Cooper Union administration, and the May 27 lawsuit for an injunction to prevent Cooper Union from charging tuition. Also, Cooper Union alumni and student members of Free Cooper Union stage protests outside of Cooper Union. Students show their support at their graduation ceremony at Cooper Union by wearing "Save Cooper Union" signs on their caps.
- June: At its June meeting, the board of trustees approves the development of a B.S. program in computer science within the school of engineering, meant to be the first of several revenue-generating programs. The new program was to be developed primarily by Teresa Dahlberg, chief academic officer and dean of the school of engineering.
- November 12: After two drafts of the computer science program are not approved by the Engineering school's curriculum committee, the second draft is submitted to the New York State Education Department, bypassing the engineering faculty. The committee points to a lack of academic rigor in the proposed programs, as well as the inclusion of "material copied verbatim from the work of faculty at other schools."

=== 2015 ===
- February: The New York State Education Department (NYSED) approves the school's application for a degree in computer science to be offered by the school of engineering.
- March 11: President Bharucha seeks the board's approval to set up an Institute for Design and Computation and invest it with degree-granting authority for a degree in computer science, without informing the board that NYSED had already approved the program within the school of engineering. Immediately following the meeting, students who had applied for admission to the school of Engineering were solicited to join this new program without telling them that the program would not be part of the Engineering school.
- March 25: The Wall Street Journal reported that Eric Schneiderman, the Attorney General of New York, had informed Cooper Union's current and past board members that his office would be investigating the school's handling of its financial portfolio – which includes the land on which the Chrysler Building stands – which may have led to the financial crisis which caused the institution to begin charging tuition to undergraduates for the first time. In The New York Times, James B. Stewart saw the move as an indication that the state would no longer take a laissez-faire attitude toward non-profit organizations, and would look into possible malfeasance before such institutions failed; with a most recently reported endowment of US$735 million, Cooper Union is in no danger of imminent failure. The focus of the investigation is said to be the board's relationship with Tishman Speyer Properties, which manages the Chrysler Building, and a US$175 million loan the school received from MetLife, for which the board used the land beneath the Chrysler Building as collateral. In addition, a bonus approved for former President George Campbell Jr. would be under scrutiny.
- April 15: The Office of the Attorney General meets with the trustees' executive committee and discusses its concerns about the contents of its NYSED application as well as the solicitation of students to the computer science program without full disclosure. That same day, the executive committee votes to terminate the computer science program and offer admission to affected students to other programs within the school of engineering.
- May 14: Chief Academic Officer and Dean of Engineering Teresa Dahlberg announced that she would be resigning effective June 30, to take a position at Syracuse University. Her service to Cooper Union was lauded by Bharucha, who credited her with playing an important role in the implementation of his "Financial Sustainability Plan."
- June 11: President Jamshed Bharucha announced that he would be resigning at the end of the month. His announcement came the day after five of the college's Trustees, including former chair Mark Epstein, resigned at once.
- September 2: The New York State Attorney General filed a cross-petition with the state and announced that the lawsuit by the Committee to Save Cooper Union against the board of trustees of Cooper Union was settled with the filing of a consent decree, still to be approved by the court. The AG will appoint an independent monitor to oversee the school's finances and stated that he will work with all parties "to put Cooper Union back on a path to fiscal sustainability". The board of trustees will add representatives of the school's students, alumni, and faculty. A committee will be created by the trustees to find a way to return the school to tuition-free status, while maintaining its academic reputation and historical level of enrollment. It will need to issue annual progress reports that will culminate with a published strategic plan by January 2018. In addition to the financial matters, the cross-petition filing asserted a number of management issues that had arisen during the Bharucha administration, including decisions and actions by Dahlberg and Bharucha to bypass faculty governance structures.
- December 17: Nancy Bannon officially signs off on the filed consent decree. Though the delay in signing caused Consent Decree VI, a requirement for a financial monitor to be installed before December 1 to be impossible, Judge Bannon notes that "the cross-petition is granted in its entirety and the Consent Decree is signed simultaneously herewith". According to the consent decree, Lincer and former chairman Robert Bernhard shall have their terms expire as of December 7, 2016. No chairman shall receive "emeritus" title while the consent decree remains in effect.

=== 2016 ===
- January 8: In discussing the possibility of attempting to establish a tuition charging permanent administration, presidential search committee co-chairman Johnny C. Taylor Jr. notes that "To give out a 50% tuition cut to everyone admitted is a high-class problem in anyone else's world".

=== 2018 ===
- January 15: The Free Education Committee (FEC) of the school's board of trustees released their recommended plan to return to full-tuition scholarships for undergraduates only by the academic year starting in the Fall of 2028.

== CU administration views ==
In an interview with an alumnus, former board chairman Mark Epstein said "in the 70s it became apparent that the school couldn't be sustainable forever ... I would imagine that if people paid 10% over the last 40 years, the school would be in pretty good shape". Epstein and vice chair Francois de Menil were among those who resigned along with Jamshed Bharucha in June 2015.

Former chairman, Richard Lincer, noted of the decision on January 10, 2014, that: "the easiest thing would be for me to say, 'We're going to keep it'. And then in 3 years, we might be dissolved. And I'm not going to have that on my conscience. I'm going to weigh the risks. And this is a considered judgement and one that the board made". He also noted that the board "met without the president" when coming to this decision. According to consent decree IV.A.1, the terms of service of Lincer & former chairman, Robert Bernhard, expired as of December 7, 2016.

In response to the Committee to Save Cooper Union's lawsuit, Justin Harmon, a spokesman for Cooper Union since 2013, told The Wall Street Journal: "The decision to charge tuition was tremendously difficult and every member of the Cooper community feels the profound effect it has had… We are disappointed that the Committee to Save Cooper Union would choose costly litigation over constructive conversation... Beginning this fall, we have increased financial assistance to the most needy students… Cooper Union will remain among the most affordable elite institutions in the world".

In December 2015, acting president Bill Mea noted "I have projected numbers out to fiscal 2019 and 2020, and I think it can become financially sustainable by those periods and thereafter", with tuition.

Free Cooper Union Red Clock Logo

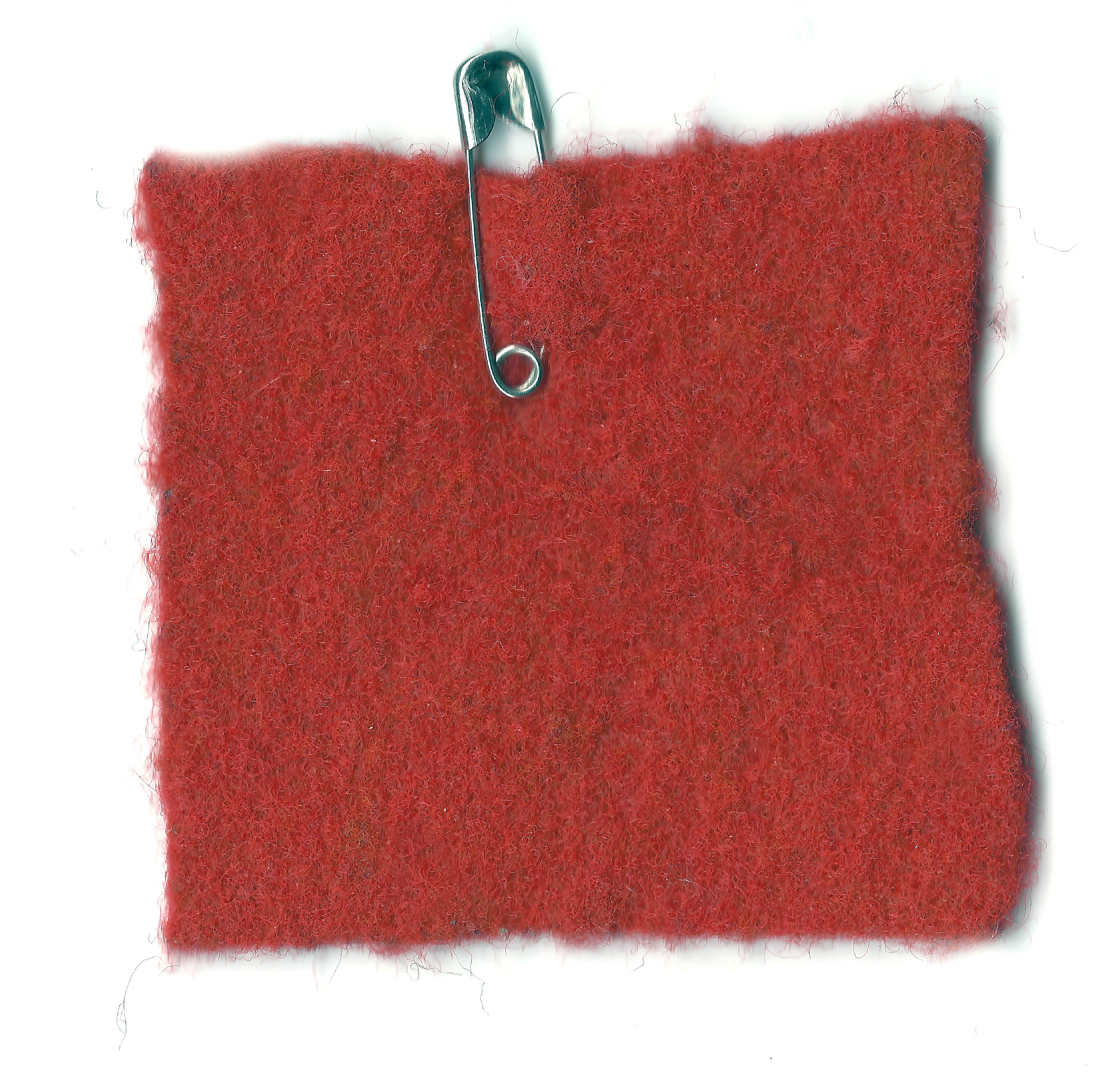
Red Square

== Organized protest efforts ==
=== Free Cooper Union ===
Free Cooper Union is the name of an organized effort to protest the 2011 proposed changes in the Cooper Union tuition policy. The group demanded a vote of no confidence in the school president, Jamshed Bharucha. Free Cooper Union is responsible for a sit-in at the President's office in June 2012, and two occupations of the Foundation Building, one in December 2012, and one in May 2013.

==== Symbols ====
The red square is worn as a symbol of support for the Free Cooper Movement. It was built from the carré rouge (red square) worn for the 2012 Quebec student protests against tuition hikes. The patch also symbolizes the Cooper Union clock tower, which is red when illuminated.

==== Exhibition: "The Free Cooper Union Salon: Step Down!" ====
In May 2013, Students for a Free Cooper Union held an exhibition in connection with the occupation of President Jamshed Bharucha's office, called, "The Free Cooper Union Salon: Step Down!" The exhibition included work from students, alumni, faculty and the community.

=== Friends of Cooper Union ===
Friends of Cooper Union (FOCU), composed of alumni, students, faculty, and staff, met in December 2011 to generate its own solutions to the financial crisis. The Way Forward, released in April 2012, outlined future plans without tuition and demanded more transparency and community engagement from the administration. They developed a financial plan based on reasonable measures to start cutting costs and develop more effective fundraising based on the school's mission.

=== Committee to Save Cooper Union ===
Committee to Save Cooper Union, Inc. (CSCU), a voluntary association of faculty, students, and alumni, formed on December 16, 2013, in order to investigate and remedy serious issues regarding the fiscal and academic management of the school. In May 2014, CSCU "is pursuing legal action as a last resort after Cooper Union's board of trustees and administration proceeded with their plans to abolish a 150-year tradition of free tuition, refusing alternatives that would preserve free tuition".

The Committee to Save Cooper Union filed a Petition with the Supreme Court of the State of New York that was electronically received by New York State Courts Electronic Filing System (NYSCEF) on May 27, 2014. A Memorandum of Law In Support of Petitioner's Article 77 Petition was received by NYSCEF on June 13, 2014.

In describing the intent of CSCU's actions, former Cooper Union Trustee Michael Borkowsky stated: "This is not a battle between The Committee to Save Cooper Union and The Cooper Union's board of trustees. It is a battle between The Cooper Union as a unique and extraordinary institution of higher education and The Cooper Union as just another college".
