= Bill N. Lacy =

American academic administrator (1933–2020)

Bill N. Lacy (April 16, 1933 – August 25, 2020) was an architect, the president of the Cooper Union for the Advancement of Science and Art, and the president of the State University of New York at Purchase.

== Early life ==
Lacy was born near Kingston, Oklahoma and was educated in Broken Bow, Oklahoma. He completed a B.A. in architecture at Oklahoma State University. Following military service, he returned to Oklahoma State and completed a master's degree in architecture in 1958. He and his wife Jane had five children together.

== Career ==
Following the completion of his master's, Lacy worked with Bill Caudill's architectural firm in Houston, Texas. When Caudill became a dean at Rice University, he invited Lacy to join him as an associate dean there. In 1965, Lacy became the founding dean of the School of Architecture at the University of Tennessee. He served as the director of the Architecture and Design program of the National Endowment for the Arts from 1971 to 1977.

His time as Cooper Union's president was marred by controversy. Shortly after his term began in 1980, he declared that the faculty union (the Cooper Union Federation of College Teachers, or CUFCT) would no longer be recognized, following the Yeshiva decision. Plans for his inauguration had to be changed when the union declared that they would boycott and picket the ceremony, and three of the four scheduled speakers (Daniel Patrick Moynihan, Robert Motherwell, and Philip Johnson) refused to cross the picket line.

In 1985, the NLRB overturned Lacy's decision and ordered that the CUFCT be recognized by Cooper Union, finding that the faculty lacked "substantial input into nonacademic matters...decisions on the hiring, promotion, tenure, and retention of teaching staff are frequently made in the absence of faculty recommendations, and when they are made following faculty recommendations, those recommendations are frequently rejected."

Following his time at Cooper Union (1980–1987), Lacy served as the executive director of the Pritzker Architecture Prize from 1988 through 2005, and as president of the State University of New York at Purchase from 1993 to 2001. His appointment as the SUNY-Purchase president was also controversial, as its College Council bypassed the presidential search committee and appointed Lacy, the search committee's second choice, instead of Stanley Fish, who was the committee's first choice, without first consulting with the committee.

During his time at Cooper Union, Lacy began a career as an architectural consultant and continued working in the field for the rest of his career, especially following his time at SUNY-Purchase. In 2003, Lacy moved to San Antonio as a consulting architect for the McNay Art Museum. He resided in San Antonio until his death in 2020.

Academic offices
Preceded by John F. White	President of Cooper Union; 1980–1987	Succeeded by John Jay Iselin
