= Mark Epstein (property developer) =

American property developer (born 1954)

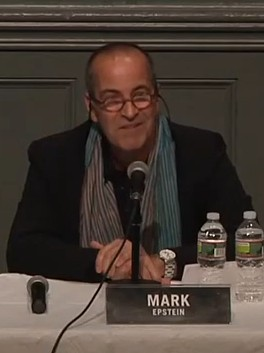
- Mark Epstein in 2011
- Born: Mark Lawrence Epstein; July 14, 1954 (age 72); New York City, U.S.
- Education: Cooper Union; Stony Brook University
- Occupation: Property developer
- Years active: c. 1990–present
- Children: 2
- Relatives: Jeffrey Epstein (brother)

Mark Lawrence Epstein (born July 14, 1954), nicknamed "Puggy", is an American property developer and real estate investor. The brother of convicted sex offender and financier Jeffrey Epstein, he has been active in real estate since the 1990s, founding and leading several companies, including Ossa Properties and Dara Partners. He also founded a silkscreen printing studio and a yacht charter service. Epstein is a 1976 graduate of Cooper Union's School of Art, and has been involved in philanthropy, serving on the boards of several nonprofits and as a chair of the Cooper Union board of trustees from 2009 to 2015.

== Early life and education ==
Mark Epstein was born in 1954 to Pauline "Paula" (née Stolofsky) and Seymour George Epstein, a Jewish couple who married in 1952. He and his brother grew up in Sea Gate, a private gated community in Coney Island, Brooklyn. Epstein is a 1976 graduate of Cooper Union's School of Art and also studied at Stony Brook University.

== Career ==
A former artist, Epstein has been a real-estate investor since the 1990s.

=== Serigraph and silkscreen printing ===
While Epstein was studying at Cooper Union's School of Art, he started a silkscreen printing company. From 1972 to 1973, his brother Jeffrey worked with him in a sales capacity. When he legally incorporated this business as a company in 1986, he named it IZMO Productions; it became part of the Izmo Family of Companies as he branched out into other ventures. IZMO Productions was a printmaking studio that made silkscreen limited prints for prominent pop artists such as Peter Max and Herb Aach, and it also did silkscreen work creating advertisements such as theater and festival posters.

In 1994, he co-founded King Graphic Technologies, which specialized in printing extra-large formats on fabrics and vinyl.

=== Yacht charter and delivery service ===
In 1986, Epstein started a charter/leasing company, Atelier Enterprises. In 1988, Atelier Enterprises's Izmo yacht was refitted and in 2000 Epstein created IZMO Marine, a branch of Atelier Enterprises that made deliveries by yacht from Miami to New York. He donated this yacht to a nonprofit in 2018.

=== Real estate ===
In 1987, Epstein started Epstein Acquisitions and in 1990 he started investing in commercial and residential real estate.

In 1991–1992, Mark Epstein became general partner of Dara Partners and co-founded Ossa Properties, a company that manages real estate owned by himself and others. The two companies were affiliated, and Ossa Properties managed Leslie Wexner's assets. Jonathan Barrett ran Ossa's day-to-day operations while simultaneously serving as an asset manager for Jeffrey Epstein's firm, J. Epstein & Co.

Around this time, Mark Epstein purchased a separate condominium—on East 66th Street—from Wexner on a tip from Jeffrey. The building carried a $7.24 million mortgage, and both the title and mortgage were transferred from one of Wexner's limited partnerships to Mark, though no documents reflecting an actual purchase exist. Ossa Properties held the majority of the building's 200 rental units, which Jeffrey used to house models, associates, girlfriends, and employees.

By 1993, Ossa Properties had grown to own more than 500 apartments across four New York City co-ops. The Wall Street Journal called the source of Epstein's wealth difficult to assess because his assets are housed in partnerships.

== Charities ==
Epstein graduated from Cooper Union's School of Art in 1976 and became active in alumni affairs, eventually serving as secretary/treasurer and president of the Alumni Association. In 2002, he was named Cooper Union's Alumnus of the Year. In 2004, he became a Trustee at the School of Art.

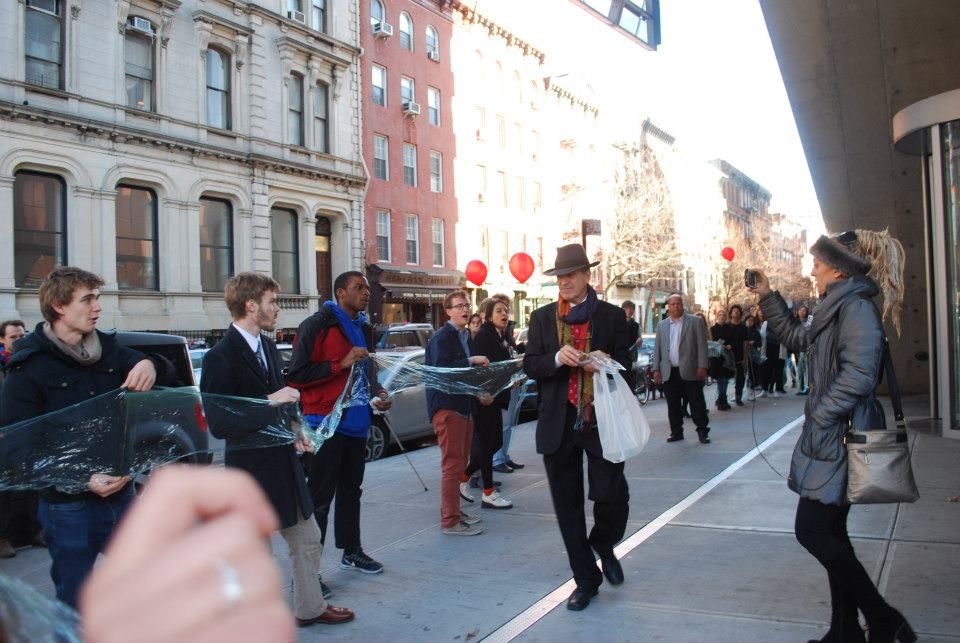
Student protestors confronting Epstein at Cooper Union, 2012

In 2007, Epstein was elected to a two-year term as vice chair of the Cooper Union board. By the end of that term, in 2009, he had donated between $500,000 and $999,000 to the school. He was then elected chair of the board and served in that capacity until 2015, when he resigned under pressure after the Cooper Union financial crisis and tuition protests.

In 1993, at age 39, Epstein semi-retired to do more work with multiple nonprofits. He was a board member of the Exit Art cultural center, and in 2011 he loaned them $75,000. Exit Art's co-founder died that year, and the gallery closed in 2012. Epstein serves on the board of the Humpty Dumpty Institute (HDI), a nonprofit that fosters dialogue between members of the United Nations, the U.S. Congress, and other governments to address global problems. In 2014, he loaned HDI at least $100,000. He also serves on the two advisory committees for the Mannes School of Music.

In 2018, after being unable to sell his yacht for his $990,000 asking price, he donated it to Marine Science and Nautical Training Academy in Charleston.

== Personal life ==
Epstein has two children with Joyce Anderson, with whom he lived in SoHo for seven years before their relationship ended. He has a home in Pennsylvania and property in West Palm Beach, Florida. While denying Jeffrey's involvement in blackmail, Mark acknowledged that his brother admitted to being involved with girls who were "too young" and not doing anything about it. At the same time, he has not implicated himself in Jeffrey's crimes and maintains that investigators cleared him of wrongdoing. In July 2025, he said he knew nothing about his brother's crimes until 2006.

After Jeffrey died in prison in 2019 after being convicted of child sex offenses, Mark publicly expressed doubt that the death was a suicide, saying, "it looks more like a homicide". He said his brother had damaging information about powerful people that made him a target. Mark insisted that the circumstances of Jeffrey's death were inconsistent with suicide and rejected the Department of Justice's findings. He said Jeffrey told him he had "dirt on people" that "could put them in prison", recounting an incident from the 2016 U.S. presidential election when Jeffrey allegedly said that if he revealed what he knew about the candidates, the election would be canceled. Mark alleged a government coverup of Jeffrey's death and said that federal authorities released doctored or incomplete evidence, including edited video from the jail. He criticized high-ranking officials for their statements and actions related to the investigation and urged authorities to reopen it. He received no response.

In 2024, Mark said he did not know why Jeffrey's friendship with Donald Trump ended. He said that Jeffrey had said on tape that he "stopped hanging out with Donald Trump when he realized Trump was a crook." In July 2025, Mark made further statements, emphasizing their closeness, rebutting Trump's assertions that he "was not a fan" of Jeffrey and Steven Cheung's statement that "the president was never in Epstein's office" after one of Jeffrey's victims mentioned having had a "disturbing" encounter with Trump in Jeffrey's office in 1995.
