= Teresa Abi-Nader Dahlberg =

American academic administrator and engineering professor

11th President of the University of Tampa
- Incumbent
- Assumed office June 1, 2024
- Preceded by: Ronald L. Vaughn

Personal details
- Born: Teresa Abi-Nader; 1961 (age 64–65)
- Education: University of Pittsburgh (BS); North Carolina State University (MS, PhD)

Teresa Abi-Nader Dahlberg (born October 29, 1961) is an American academic administrator and engineer who served for two and a half years as the 11th president of The University of Tampa, resigning for personal reasons on October 16th, 2026.

== Early life and education ==
Dahlberg was raised near Uniontown, Pennsylvania in a Lebanese American family of six children. She earned a bachelor's degree in electrical engineering from the University of Pittsburgh. While working at IBM, she completed a master's degree and Ph.D. in computer engineering from North Carolina State University in 1993. Her doctoral dissertation was titled, "Dependability Evaluation of Large Systems with Dependent Failures Using a Hierarchical Network Model".

== Academic career ==
Dahlberg began her academic career as a visiting assistant professor in computer science at Winthrop University (1994–1995). From 1995 to 2013, she served as associate dean of the College of Computing and Informatics at University of North Carolina at Charlotte. She was a principal investigator conducting research in computer education, computing, and wireless networking.

In 2013, Dahlberg became the dean of the Albert Nerken School of Engineering at Cooper Union in New York City and she was named the college's chief academic officer in 2014. During her tenure at Cooper Union, Dahlberg faced criticism from alumni, faculty, and students. Her time at the college coincided with the Cooper Union financial crisis and tuition protests. She resigned in 2015 following controversy and criticism from a group of alumni, faculty, and students over allegations of plagiarism in academic program proposals and bypassing faculty governance structures. The controversy also led to an investigation by the New York State Attorney General.

From 2015 to 2019, Dahlberg served as the dean of the College of Engineering and Computer Science at Syracuse University, where she was also a professor of electrical engineering and computer science.

On March 1, 2019, she became the provost and vice chancellor for academic affairs at Texas Christian University.

In December 2023, Dahlberg was announced as the 11th president of University of Tampa. She officially succeeded Ronald L. Vaughn on June 1, 2024. On October 16th, 2026, her resignation as president of the University of Tampa was announced.
