= Gano Dunn =

American academic administrator (1870–1953)

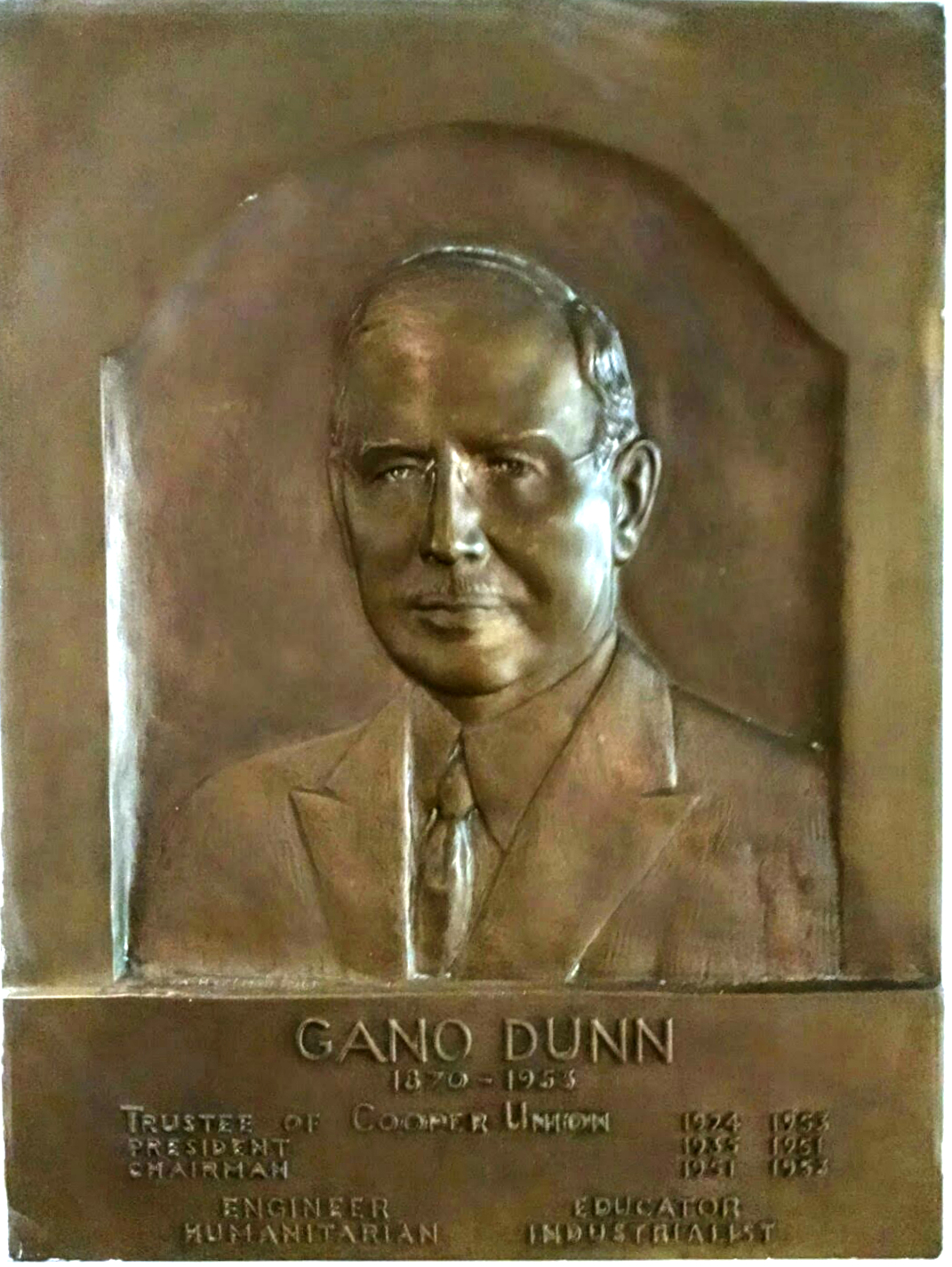
- Plaque honoring Gano Dunn at Cooper Union
- Born: October 18, 1870; New York, New York, U.S.
- Died: April 10, 1953 (aged 82)
- Education: City College of New York Columbia University
- Spouse: Julia Thurston Gardiner Gayley (m. 1920; died 1937)
- Awards: IEEE Edison Medal (1937); Hoover Medal (1940)
- Scientific career
- Workplaces: J. G. White Engineering Corporation

Gano Sillick Dunn (October 18, 1870 – April 10, 1953) was an American electrical engineer who served as the president of Cooper Union. He was an early chairman and CEO of the United States National Research Council.

== Early life and career ==
Son of Civil War veteran General N. Gano Dunn and Amelia Sillick, Gano Dunn was born in Yorkville, New York. With a prospering law practice, General Dunn raised Gano and his younger brother Harris, across from Central Park, as befitted one of the "best-known lawyers in the city". Inspired by his paternal grandfather, schoolteacher and inventor Nathaniel Dunn, young Gano was encouraged in both scholarship and practical invention.

In 1883, when Gano was twelve, he accompanied the former Mrs. Maria G. Robins Caswell to Europe. They were there met by General Dunn. With the General and Maria masquerading as man and wife, Gano traveled Europe for a year and half. By 1886, General Dunn's whereabouts were unknown to his wife Amelia and New York society.

At the age of fifteen, while attending City College of New York, Gano began to work for as an operator for the Western Union Telegraph Company. During this period, in March 1887, Mrs. Maria Robins filed a lawsuit against Gano's mother, Mrs. Amelia S. Dunn, over a deed to a New York City property. In 1884, under pressure from her "runaway husband", Mrs. Dunn had been forced to transfer the property, then valued at $18,000, to General Dunn's office clerk, Henry G. Hunt for a single dollar. Hunt then transferred the deed to Mrs. Robins. Attempting to maintain her interests, Mrs. Dunn gave a second deed to her sister-in-law, who then transferred this second deed to Mrs. Dunn's sister. With affidavits filed by her estranged husband from Canada, and testimony from Mrs. Robins, the case stretched until November 1887. Mrs. Amelia Dunn finally won the lawsuit and the Hunt/Robins deed to the property was invalidated.

As a young college student, Dunn visited the laboratory of Thomas A. Edison.

"Out of an almost infinite kindness for young men who were struggling, Mr. Edison received me in the midst of some laboratory work he was doing in the coating of laminated armature plates. Seeming to be interested in the questions I asked him, he drew me out in turn, and spent an hour personally showing me over his lamp works. .. . At the end of the visit, he offered me a job."

— Gano Dunn, Edison Medalist, 1937 : Presentation Ceremonies at Winter Convention, American Institute of Electrical Engineers, New York, N. Y.".

Dunn declined Edison's job offer and continued pursuing his college degree. In 1889, the nineteen-year-old earned a Bachelor of Science degree while graduating Phi Beta Kappa. Continuing his education at Columbia University, Dunn's life was changed by assisting Nikola Tesla.

"Tesla solved the greatest problem in electrical engineering of his time. . . . My contact as [Tesla’s] assistant at the historic Columbia University high frequency lecture afterward, has left an indelible impression and an inspiration which has influenced my life."

— Gano Dunn, Letter dated July, 1931

Dunn and Columbia Professor Edwin Howard Armstrong both served as pallbearers at Tesla's funeral.

In 1891, Dunn received the first degree in Electrical engineering granted by Columbia University.

His father's whereabouts remained unknown, until in August 1892, reporters appeared at the Dunn home with dispatches from Denver. Without money and thought to be insane, the former lawyer had shot himself and died. Gano quickly telegraphed Denver authorities to hold the body. With the intention to bring the body back home, Gano expressed to reporters the "sorrow that the scandal has dragged the family name through mire should now be revived by suicide". Gano Dunn then put his father's scandals behind him. Vannevar Bush's biography of Gano simply states: "Dunn's father died before Gano had finished his education;".

Returning to CCNY, Dunn was one of two 1897 Master of Science graduates, alongside Stephen P. Duggan.

Dunn was president of the American Institute of Electrical Engineers from 1911 to 1912. Gano Dunn served as treasurer and later Chairman of Trustees of the Simplified Spelling Board. He was the president of the Cooper Union from 1935 to 1951.

== Refugee ship Principe di Undine ==
Gano Dunn served as the president of J. G. White Engineering since 1913 and was in Italy at the outbreak of World War I. Americans stranded in Europe had fled from Austria, France, Spain, Switzerland and Serbia to Italy, trying to book passage back to the United States. With banks refusing to cash personal checks, Americans were short on funds. In Italy, a bank moratorium had been declared, with banks paying only "limited and small amounts daily".

A Committee of Guarantors with Dunn, as treasurer, pledged 500,000 francs, gold to secure the charter of the ship Principe di Undine from Genoa to New York City. Using their personal fortunes, aided by American Express's Genoa office and National City Bank of New York, made the initial 10% payment five minutes before the charter option expired. Within two days, 400 anxious Americans booked passage, with Gano Dunn collecting cash or confirming evidence of credit. Only 60,000 francs were available in cash, the rest being credit, with payment guaranteed by the Committee.

Dr. Butler, before sailing, had obtained permission from Winston Churchill, First Lord of the Admiralty to pass Gibraltar. Challenged there by an English torpedo boat destroyer, the Principe di Undine was allowed to proceed into the Atlantic. 700 miles from New York, the ship was commanded to stop by an English warship. After verifying her cargo and passengers, the ship was allowed to proceed.

During the voyage, a series of lectures on various topics were organized, with Mr Gano Dunn speaking on wireless telegraphy. Each morning, Dunn posted the bulletins from the wireless on the progress of the war.

Concerned about their compatriots still stranded in Europe, the passengers voted to appoint a committee to inform public opinion and the United States Government of the conditions abroad. Arriving in New York on August 23, 1914, Gano Dunn and the rest of the committee met with an assistant to the Secretary of State on Tuesday, August 25 and officially expressed to him their satisfaction with the steps the Government had taken at that time.

== Marriage ==
Among his fellow refugees aboard ship were Mrs. Julia Gardiner Gayley and her daughter Miss Florence Gayley of New York City.

In 1920, upon the death of her first husband, James Gayley, Julia Thurston Gardiner Gayley married Gano Dunn. The couple moved to her home at 20 Washington Square North.

== Inventions ==
Gano Dunn invented and patented many electronic and mechanical devices.

- US patent 797271, "Electric Switch" A Drum Sequencer Controller
- CA patent 103309, "Machine for Bending Metal Strips Edgewise"
- GB 190409874, "Improvements in Electric Switches"
- GB patent 190413779, "Improvements in Electrical Distribution particularly applicable for Controlling Electric Motors"
- GB patent 190403919, "Improvements in System of Speed Regulation for Electro-motor Driven Machinery."
- GB patent 190626193, "Improvements in Machines for Bending Metal Strips Edgewise"
- US patent 493375, "Balanced Armature for Dynamo Electric Machines or Electric Motors and Method of Balancing Same"
- "US design patent D0027098 : Frame for Dynamo".
- US patent 654142, "Automatic Electromagnetic Brake"
- US patent 792762, "Improvements in Dynamo Electric Machines"
- "US Patents by Inventor Gano S Dunn".

== Honors and awards ==
Dunn was an elected member of the United States National Academy of Sciences, the American Academy of Arts and Sciences, and the American Philosophical Society.

== Legacy ==
In 1955, James A. Healy and Harris A. Dunn, in memory of Harris' late brother Gano, presented Colby College Library with a rare copy of the 1491 Nuremberg Chronicle.

Academic offices
Preceded by Robert Fulton Cutting	President of Cooper Union; 1935 — 1951	Succeeded by Edwin S. Burdell
