= Danielle Dixson =

American ecologist

- Education: James Cook University
- Scientific career
- Fields: Marine ecology
- Thesis: Smelling home: the use of olfactory cues for settlement site selection by coral reef fish larvae (2012)
- Doctoral advisor: Philip Munday; Geoffrey Jones; Morgan Pratchett

Danielle Lynn Dixson is an American ecologist. She was previously an Associate Professor of Marine Ecology in the School of Marine Science and Policy at the University of Delaware. Her research focusses on how human-induced change to marine ecosystems impacts animal behaviour. Her work, now thought to be fraudulent, was about understanding how ocean acidification affects the behaviour of coral reef fishes. As of 2022 her work however came under scrutiny due to inexplicable data. As of August 2026 three of her papers have been retracted

== Academic career ==
Dixson studied Marine Science at the University of Tampa in Florida, obtaining her B.S. in 2005. She went on to obtain her Ph.D. in 2012 under the supervision of Philip Munday, Geoffrey Jones, and Morgan Pratchett at James Cook University, Australia. From 2011, she worked as postdoctoral researcher at Georgia Institute of Technology until her appointment as an Assistant Professor in 2013. In 2015 she began as an assistant professor at the University of Delaware before becoming an associate professor in 2019. She was fired from the University of Delaware in 2023 due to concerns about fraudulent research.

Dixson is the author of Sea Stories, a children's book series based on scientific literature that aims to promote awareness of marine conservation, STEM subjects, and visibility of minorities from an early age. She is a member of the International Society of Chemical Ecology and was the recipient of their Early Career Award in 2019.

== Research ==
Dixson's research broadly focuses on the relationship of how marine animals sense their environment and how this influences their decisions. Her major research areas include the role of chemical cues in corals and coral reef fishes, and the influence of ocean acidification on fish behaviour.

== Misconduct allegations ==
Dixson has been accused of fabricating primary data by other researchers in the field and is the subject of ongoing institutional investigations. On August 9, 2022, Science published a piece announcing that an investigation by the University of Delaware found Dixson guilty of scientific misconduct, including data fabrication and falsification related to her work on coral reef fish behaviour. A separate investigation is reportedly being conducted by the Georgia Institute of Technology. In 2022 a first retraction happened for Dixson The next year; a second paper that Dixson originally published in 2016 was retracted on January 16th, 2023. In 2026 another paper was retracted due to statistically implausible variance in the data

== Honours and awards ==
- International Society of Chemical Ecology Early Career Award
- National Science Foundation (NSF) Faculty Early Career Development Award
- James Cook University Outstanding Alumni Award

== See also ==
- Oona Lönnstedt See misconduct case of Oona Lönnstedt who was also found to have conducted discredited fish research at James Cook University

== Selected publications ==
- Munday, Philip; Dixson, Danielle; Donelson, Jennifer; Jones, G. P.; Pratchett, Morgan S.; Galina V Devitsina; Kjell B Døving (2009). "Ocean acidification impairs olfactory discrimination and homing ability of a marine fish". Proceedings of the National Academy of Sciences of the United States of America. 106 (6): 1848–1852. Bibcode:2009PNAS..106.1848M. doi:10.1073/pnas.0809996106. PMC 2644126. PMID 19188596. Wikidata Q37100869.
- Nilsson, Göran; Dixson, Danielle; Domenici, Paolo; McCormick, Mark; Sørensen, Christina; Watson, Sue-Ann; Munday, Philip (2012). "Near-future carbon dioxide levels alter fish behaviour by interfering with neurotransmitter function". Nature Climate Change. 2 (3): 201–204. doi:10.1038/nclimate1352. Wikidata Q56567483.
