= Ronald L. Vaughn =

American marketer and academic administrator

10th President of the University of Tampa
- In office January 30, 1995 – May 31, 2024
- Preceded by: David G. Ruffer
- Succeeded by: Teresa Abi-Nader Dahlberg

Personal details
- Born: June 27, 1946 (age 79)
- Spouse: Renée Vaughn
- Education: Indiana State University (BS, MBA); University of Georgia (PhD)
- Profession: Marketing and business, academic administrator

Ronald L. Vaughn is an American academic administrator and business scholar who served as the 10th president of The University of Tampa from 1995 until his retirement in May 2024.

== Education ==
Vaughn earned a Bachelor of Science in marketing in 1968 and a Master of Business Administration in marketing in 1970, both from Indiana State University. He later obtained a Ph.D. in marketing from the University of Georgia in 1975. In 1994, he attended the Harvard University Institute for Educational Management.

== Career ==
Vaughn was previously a consultant of marketing and business in his own small company.

He began his academic career at Bradley University as a faculty member in the Department of Marketing before joining the University of Tampa in 1984 as a coordinator in the Department of Marketing. He later held the position of Max H. Hollingsworth Endowed Chair of American Enterprise. During his tenure at the university, he served as the director of the MBA program and as dean of the College of Business and Graduate Studies.

Since his appointment, Vaughn has held leadership positions in various organizations, including:

- President of the Tampa Bay Chapter of The Planning Forum
- Chairman of the American Red Cross Tampa Bay Chapter
- President of the Florida West Coast Chapter of the American Marketing Association
- Chairman of the Independent Colleges and Universities of Florida
- President of the Sunshine State Conference

== Publications ==
- Police services: a survey of citizensatisfaction. study conducted by Advisory Committee on Police-Community Relations Peoria, Ill. Peoria, Ill: Advisory Committee on Police-Community Relations, 1982. Statistics Surveys. Ronald L. Vaughn, OCLC 69375173
- Preface: Marketing Nonprofit Organizations. Journal of the Academy of Marketing Science, v9 n1 (1/1981), Ronald L. Vaughn, ISSN 0092-0703, Unique ID: 5723537378
- Multi-Attribute Approach To Understanding Shopping Behavior. Journal of the Academy of Marketing Science, v5 n2 (06/1977): 281-294. Ronald L. Vaughn, Behram J. Hansotia, ISSN 0092-0703, Unique ID: 5723540710
