= Jamshed Bharucha =

American academic

Founding Vice Chancellor of Sai University, Chennai
- In office July 1, 2020 – September 30, 2024

12th President of The Cooper Union
- In office July 1, 2011 – June 30, 2015
- Preceded by: George Campbell Jr.
- Succeeded by: Laura Sparks

7th Provost of Tufts University
- In office July 1, 2002 – July 1, 2011
- Preceded by: Sol Gittleman
- Succeeded by: David Harris

Personal details
- Born: Jamshed Bharucha; 1956 (age 69–70) Mumbai, India
- Children: 1
- Education: Vassar College (AB); Yale University (MA); Harvard University (PhD)

Jamshed Bharucha is an Indian-American cognitive neuroscientist who has served in leadership roles in higher education in the United States and in India.

Bharucha is the founding vice chancellor emeritus of Sai University, Chennai, and was previously the inaugural vice chancellor of SRM University, Andhra Pradesh. Bharucha is also president emeritus of Cooper Union, a college located in Manhattan, New York City, having served as the 12th president of Cooper Union during the time of Cooper Union's financial crisis and tuition protests.

Prior to becoming president of Cooper Union, Bharucha was provost and senior vice president of Tufts University and professor in the psychology, music, and neuroscience departments. Before his time at Tufts, Bharucha was the John Wentworth Professor of Psychological & Brain Sciences and dean of the faculty of arts & sciences at Dartmouth College. Bharucha returned to Dartmouth as a distinguished fellow and research professor, where his research and teaching are focused on the cognitive foundations of education. He now teaches at both Dartmouth and online at Sai University. His research is in cognitive psychology and neuroscience, focusing on the cognitive and neural basis of the perception of music. He was editor of the interdisciplinary journal Music Perception.

== Early life and education ==
Jamshed Bharucha was born in Mumbai, India. His father Jal Bharucha, a Parsi engineer from Mumbai, and mother Elizabeth Bharucha (born Elizabeth Emily Robinson), a musician from Albany, New York, met at the University of Michigan. His parents were founding members of the Bombay International School, from which Jamshed graduated. Bharucha studied violin in Mumbai, received an Associate’s Diploma in violin performance from Trinity College of Music (London) in 1973, and then continued to study violin at Vassar.

Bharucha graduated from Vassar College where he majored in biopsychology (1978), then received an M.A. in philosophy from Yale University (1979) and a Ph.D. in cognitive psychology from Harvard University (1983). At Harvard he worked with Carol L. Krumhansl, Stephen Kosslyn, William K. Estes and Roger Brown.

== Academic and administrative career ==
=== Dartmouth College ===
Bharucha began his academic career at Dartmouth College, where he was John Wentworth Professor, and entered its academic administration as associate dean for the social sciences, eventually moving to deputy provost and then to become a dean of the faculty of arts & sciences. He was the first Indian American dean of a school at an Ivy League institution. While in the Dartmouth administration, he established the Dartmouth Brain Imaging Center. His principal faculty appointment was in the department of psychological & brain sciences, but he also taught in the program in linguistics & cognitive science and the program in electroacoustic music (now called "digital musics").

As an academic administrator, he launched initiatives on teaching and research, as well as their integration in the form of active learning, encouraging undergraduates to get involved in research with their professors.

After spending 2015-2016 at Harvard following his time at Cooper Union, Bharucha was appointed distinguished fellow at Dartmouth, where he taught in two departments: education, and psychological & brain science. He then went to India; after his time at Sai University he returned to Dartmouth, where he teaches part-time and conducts research. He also teaches part-time online at Sai University.

=== Tufts University ===
Bharucha moved to Tufts in 2002 to assume the position of provost & senior vice president. As provost, Bharucha oversaw the seven schools, the Tisch College, the Institute for Global Leadership, the Fares Center and the Clinical & Translational Research Institute.

Bharucha launched the Summer Scholars program, which provides opportunities for undergraduate students to work on collaborative research with faculty across the university and its affiliated hospitals. He also launched the University Seminar, a cross-disciplinary course, open to undergraduate, graduate and professional students.

=== Cooper Union controversy and investigation by New York state Attorney General ===
Bharucha was appointed as the twelfth president of The Cooper Union for the Advancement of Science and Art effective July 1, 2011. His tenure at Cooper Union was marked by a financial crisis and tuition protests. An investigation by the New York State attorney general's office ensued into the institution's decision to charge tuition for the first time in its history and other financial decisions made by the trustees. This eventually led to the attorney general's office brokering a settlement of a lawsuit filed by a group of students, alumni and faculty. On June 10, 2015 five of the trustees, who had been supporters of tuition and were opponents of the settlement, resigned. The following day, Bharucha announced that he would be resigning to become a visiting scholar at Harvard University.

=== SRM University - Amaravati ===
Bharucha served as the inaugural vice chancellor of SRM University, Amaravati, a new university in the newly designed capital city (Amaravati) of the state of Andhra Pradesh in India. He established a partnership with Minerva Schools at KGI to adopt their active learning platform.

=== Sai University, Chennai ===
Bharucha served as the founding vice chancellor of Sai University, a new university launched in the city of Chennai, from 2020 to 2024.

Academic offices
Preceded by George Campbell Jr.	President of Cooper Union; 2011 - 2015	Succeeded by Laura Sparks
