= Mary Schmidt Campbell =

American university administrator and Museum curator (born 1947)

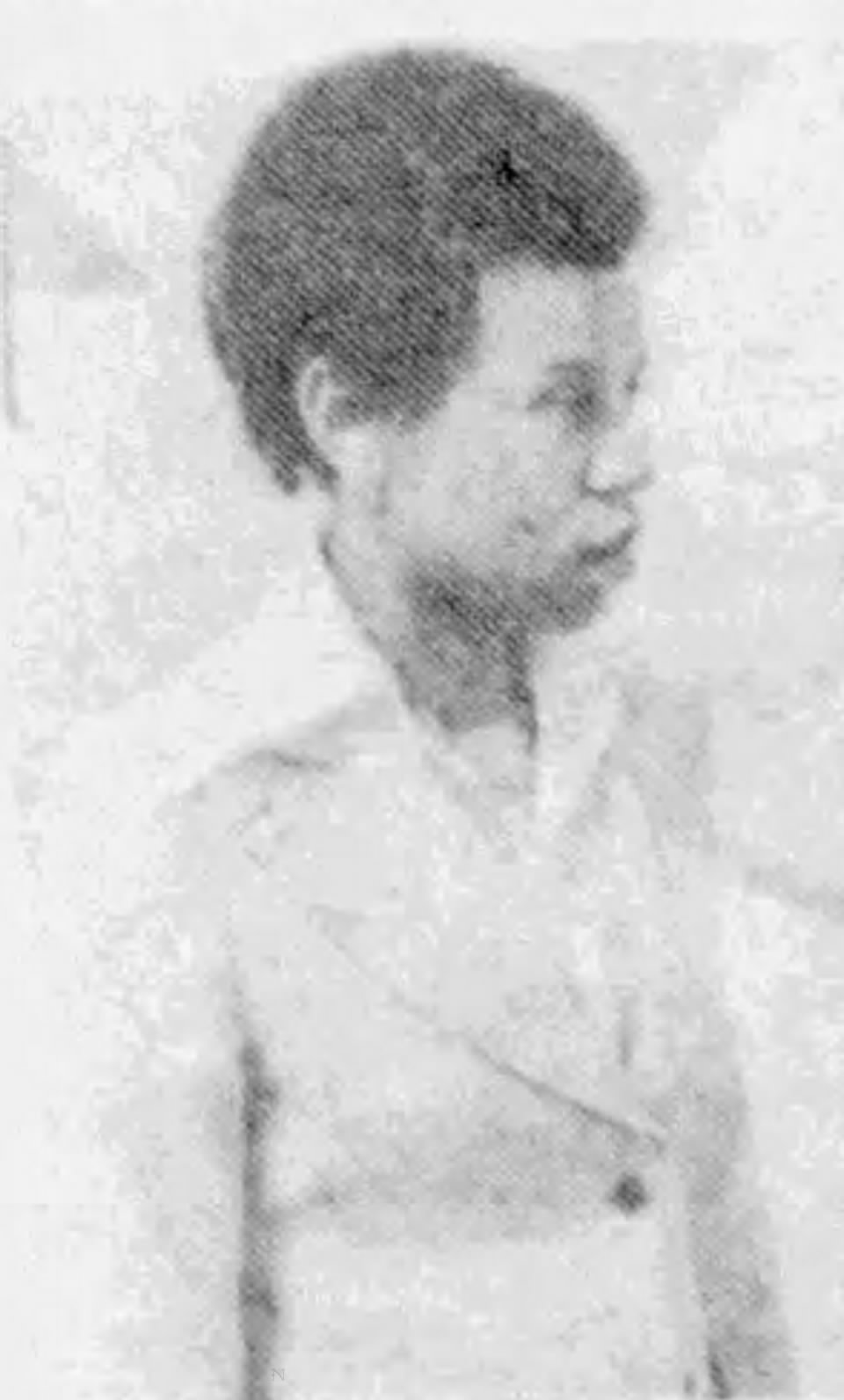
- Campbell in 1977

10th President of Spelman College
- In office 2015–2022
- Preceded by: Beverly Daniel Tatum
- Succeeded by: Helene D. Gayle

Personal details
- Born: October 21, 1947 (age 79) Philadelphia, Pennsylvania, U.S.
- Spouse: George Campbell Jr. (m. 1968)
- Education: Swarthmore College; Syracuse University
- Profession: Museum curator Cultural affairs commissioner College dean College president

Mary Schmidt Campbell (born October 21, 1947) is an American academic and government administrator, and museum director. She was the 10th president of Spelman College, serving from 2015 to 2022. Previously, she served as a director and curator for art museums, as the director of the commission for the New York City Department of Cultural Affairs, and for many years as the dean of the Tisch School of the Arts at New York University.

== Early life and education ==
Schmidt Campbell was born to Elaine and Harvey Schmidt in Philadelphia, Pennsylvania, on October 21, 1947.

She attended Philadelphia High School for Girls. After earning a Bachelor of Arts degree in English literature from Swarthmore College in 1969, Schmidt Campbell taught English literature at Nkumbi International College in Zambia. She returned to the U.S. and studied art history at Syracuse University, graduating with a masters. She later earned a doctorate in humanities from Syracuse University. Her 1982 doctoral dissertation followed the life of the Afro-American artist Romare Bearden, and his quest struggle to "create a timeless and enduring body of work without relinquishing his unique individual identity".

== Career ==
In 1974, Schmidt Campbell became a curator of the Everson Museum of Art in Syracuse, New York, and the art editor at Syracuse New Times.

=== Studio Museum in Harlem ===
Her career in New York began at the Studio Museum in Harlem during a time when the city was on the verge of bankruptcy and Harlem was in steep decline. Under her leadership, the museum was transformed from a rented loft to the country's first accredited Black fine arts museum.

From 1977 to 1987, Schmidt Campbell served as executive director of the Studio Museum. During her tenure there, she steered the museum from a struggling organization located in a loft space above a liquor store to a 60,000 sq. ft. building and into one of the nation's premier black fine-arts museums with an annual $2 million budget. At the time, the museum was the only one of its kind to be accredited by the American Association of Museums. Noticing the lack of a facility that could adequately communicate African-American art's "depth and range," she organized a series of exhibitions devoted to the country's leading black artists.

=== New York City Department of Cultural Affairs ===
In 1987, New York Mayor Ed Koch, invited Schmidt Campbell to serve as the city's cultural affairs commissioner. In this role, she led the Department of Cultural Affairs which oversees the operations and capital development of the city's major cultural institutions. As a commissioner, she gained a reputation as an advocate for large and small arts organizations throughout all five boroughs.

At the age of 40, Schmidt Campbell was sworn in as the Commissioner of the New York City Department of Cultural Affairs October 1987 by then-New York City Mayor Ed Koch. With an annual $172 million budget, the department provides operating and capital improvement funds to 32 major institutions—including museums, theaters, zoos, and botanical gardens—and grants program money to hundreds of neighborhood arts groups. A few weeks into her tenure, the stock market crashed, whereupon the city government made major budget cuts. The department's budget was initially cut by $7 million, but Schmidt Campbell was able to minimize the cuts to $1 million.

One of her main accomplishments was organizing and fundraising "New York and the Arts: A Cultural Affair," a campaign focused on promoting cultural activities throughout the city and encouraging attendance. Other accomplishments included a pilot program focused on introducing the arts to low-income youth.

In 1989, she was reappointed by Mayor Koch's successor, David Dinkins. At her swearing-in ceremony in 1990, she proposed that the city's budget on drug education should be reallocated to her department for cultural and recreational programs for schoolchildren, saying that "if our children can be addicted to the power of language and the excitement of ideas, if they have the benefit of the time and attention of creative adults who have only the highest expectation of them, if excellence and discipline are the standards set for them, they will rise to the occasion."

In May 1990, the Smithsonian Institution named Schmidt Campbell to be the chairwoman of a 22-member advisory board to study ways to exhibit the heritage of black Americans on the National Mall, which laid the groundwork for the creation of the National Museum of African American History and Culture.

=== NYU Tisch School of the Arts ===
On October 1, 1991, Schmidt Campbell was named dean of the Tisch School of the Arts at New York University. During her tenure, Schmidt Campbell expanded the school's arts profile, including digital media in addition to theater, film, and television, increased the recruitment of a more diverse faculty and student body, and led an unprecedented capital campaign for the school. In 2008, Schmidt Campbell established the Tisch Talent Identification Process, a program that recruits high-performing, high-need students to the school.

Tisch also founded new disciplines and departments, "including a moving image archiving and preservation program, the Clive Davis Institute of Recorded Music and a dual M.B.A.-M.F.A. degree with the Stern School of Business at N.Y.U."

In September 2009, President Barack Obama appointed Schmidt Campbell as the vice chair of the President's Committee on the Arts and Humanities.

=== Spelman College presidency (2015–2022) ===
Schmidt Campbell assumed the role of president of Spelman College on August 1, 2015, succeeding Beverly Daniel Tatum. Under her leadership, Spelman moved from 77 to 57 on the U.S. News & World Report annual Best College rankings and ranked No.1 HBCU for the 13th year in a row. In addition, the college secured the No. 6 spot on U.S. News' inaugural list of Top Performers on Social Mobility.

Under her leadership, Campbell successfully completed the development of the Mary Schmidt Campbell Center for Innovation and the Arts. This building is over 80,000 square feet, and is the first academic center to be built on the campus in over two decades.

Schmidt Campbell retired from Spelman College on June 30, 2022. Her successor is Helene D. Gayle.

== Awards and honors ==
Schmidt Campbell sits on the boards of the Alfred P. Sloan Foundation, the Doris Duke Charitable Foundation, the High Museum of Art, the J. Paul Getty Trust, and is on the Advisory Boards of the Bonner Foundation, and the Association of Governing Boards of Universities and Colleges.

She was previously on the boards of the American Academy in Rome, the New York Shakespeare Festival, and the United Nations International School.

Schmidt Campbell is a fellow of the New York Institute for the Humanities and the American Academy of Arts and Sciences. She received a Candace Award from the National Coalition of 100 Black Women in 1986.

Schmidt Campbell holds several honorary degrees, including one from her alma mater, Swarthmore College in Pennsylvania, as well as the College of New Rochelle, Colgate University, City University of New York, and Pace University.

At Syracuse, she has been honored with the Arents Pioneer Medal (1993), a Chancellor's Citation and the College of Arts and Sciences' Distinguished Alumni Award. She was also awarded an honorary degree (2021).

== Personal life ==
Schmidt Campbell lives in Atlanta, Georgia. She has been married since 1968 to physicist George Campbell Jr., who is president emeritus of the Cooper Union. They are the parents of three sons.

== Selected works ==
Schmidt Campbell has published books on a variety of topics. These include:

- An American Odyssey: The Life and Work of Romare Bearden. New York, NY: Oxford University Press. 2018. ISBN 9780195059090. OCLC 1103917174. For this book, she won the 2018 Hooks National Book Award from the Benjamin L. Hooks Institute for Social Change at the University of Memphis.
- Artistic Citizenship: A Public Voice for the Arts. New York: Taylor & Francis. 2006. ISBN 9780415978668. OCLC 963681661.
- Memory and metaphor : the art of Romare Bearden, 1940-1987. New York: Studio Museum in Harlem. 1991. ISBN 9780195063479. OCLC 885231664.
- Harlem Renaissance: Art of Black America. New York: Harry N. Abrams. 1987. ISBN 9780810981287. OCLC 13945412.

Schmidt Campbell has contributed to several discussions, articles on higher education topics. In 2020, she penned an op-ed for The New York Times in response to how the college was affected by the COVID-19 pandemic. She also appeared on MSNBC's PoliticsNation with Al Sharpton to discuss how the coronavirus pandemic has affected historically Black colleges and universities.
