= Edwin S. Burdell =

Dean at Massachusetts Institute of Technology

Edwin Sharp Burdell (February 2, 1898 – August 30, 1978) was the director (1938-1951) and president (1951-1960) of the Cooper Union for 22 years and the first dean of the School of Humanities and Social Sciences at the Massachusetts Institute of Technology.

Burdell left Cooper Union in 1960 to take up an appointment as the president of Middle East Technical University in Ankara, Turkey. He was subsequently resident consultant of the Cranbrook Institutes in the early 1960s, where his responsibility was to help coordinate the activities of the six Cranbrook Institutions.

Academic offices
Preceded by Gano Dunn	President of Cooper Union; 1951 —1960	Succeeded by Richard F. Humphreys
