= George Campbell Jr. =

American theoretical physicist (born 1945)

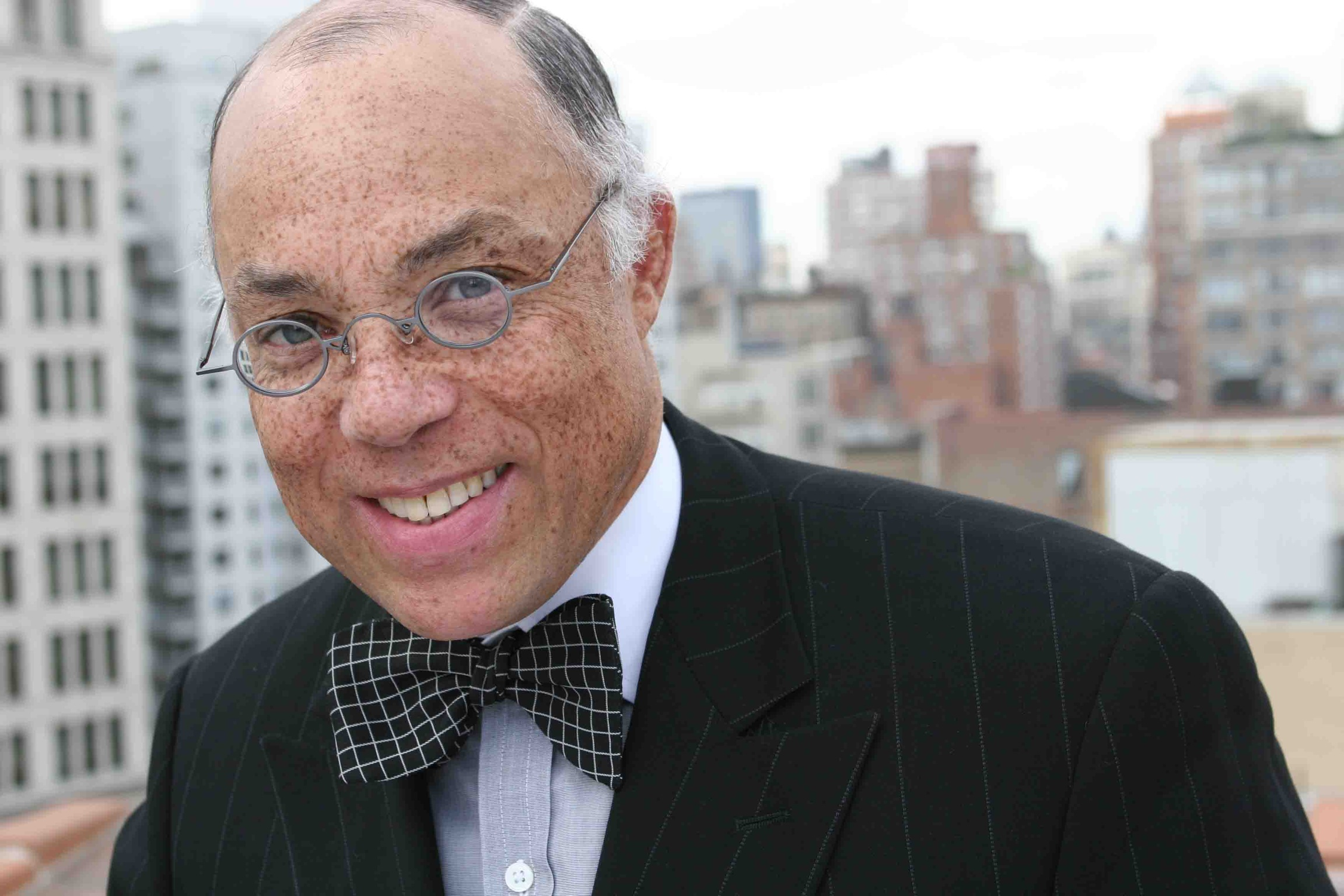
- Born: December 2, 1945 (age 80); Richmond, Virginia, U.S.
- Education: Syracuse University (PhD); Drexel University (BS)
- Spouse: Mary Schmidt Campbell (m. 1968)
- Children: 3
- Scientific career
- Fields: Theoretical Physics
- Workplaces: Cooper Union
- Thesis: Su (4) Symmetry and the Baryon Resonance Mass Spectrum (1977)
- Doctoral advisor: Kameshwar C. Wali

George Campbell Jr. (born December 2, 1945) is an American theoretical physicist, who was the eleventh president of The Cooper Union for the Advancement of Science and Art from July 2000 to July 2011.

== Education ==
Campbell earned a PhD in theoretical physics from Syracuse University in 1977 and a BS in physics from Drexel University in 1968. He is a graduate of the Executive Management Program at Yale University.

== Career ==
Campbell served as president of The Cooper Union for the Advancement of Science and Art from July, 2000 through June, 2011, and upon retirement was elected President Emeritus by the board of trustees. During Campbell's tenure, Cooper Union replaced 40 percent of its academic space and grew its endowment from $100 million to more than $600 million.

Previously Campbell was the president and CEO of the National Action Council for Minorities in Engineering (NACME), Inc., a non-profit corporation focused on engineering education and science and technology policy. Additionally he spent 12 years at AT&T Bell Laboratories, served as a U.S. delegate to the International Telecommunication Union, and served on the faculties of Nkumbi International College Zambia, and Syracuse University. He has published papers in mathematical physics, high-energy physics, satellite systems, digital communications, science and technology policy and science education and is co-editor of Access Denied: Race, Ethnicity and the Scientific Enterprise. He has served on a number of national policy boards, including the United States Secretary of Energy Board and the Morella Commission of the U.S. Congress.

Campbell currently serves on the Board of Directors of Consolidated Edison, Inc. He is also on the Board of Trustees of Rensselaer Polytechnic Institute, MITRE Corporation, the Josiah Macy Foundation, the United States Naval Academy Foundation and is chairman of the board of trustees at Webb Institute.

=== Cooper Union controversy and investigation by New York state Attorney General ===
In the wake of the Cooper Union's difficulties that led to a financial crisis during the presidency of Jamshed Bharucha wherein the School dismantled its 150-year mission of free tuition, many faculty, students and alumni questioned Campbell's actions and intentions as president. Prior to the controversial decision, a 2009 article in The Wall Street Journal had reported that the school would sidestep a crisis. Despite this and other reports, on October 31, 2011, Bharucha announced an insurmountable deficit that allegedly could not keep the institution sustainable without tuition. In May 2013, former Board of Trustees investment committee chair John Michaelson admitted the school could have continued to use the endowment to cover deficits and would have survived until 2018, when the higher payments from the Chrysler lease start.

In an investigation of Cooper Union's finances released in a cross petition on September 2, 2015, New York state Attorney General Eric Schneiderman found that "President Campbell misinformed the community as to the strength of Cooper Union’s finances, when they had sufficient information to know the truth of the school’s increasingly dire condition." Additionally, Schneiderman found that Campbell had an "apparent conflict of interest" in a $175,000 bonus that would to be awarded George Campbell Jr., if construction of the New Academic Building at 41 Cooper Square was completed while he was president.

The investigation concluded that the Schools financial difficulties in fact had happened under Campbell's presidency and planning: "The Attorney General’s financial and operational investigation, which began in August 2014 and the results of which are being released today, revealed that Cooper Union’s current financial problems are rooted in the failure of a 2006 plan to finance the construction of a new academic building at 41 Cooper Square. The plan involved the school taking out a $175 million mortgage loan on the land it owns beneath the Chrysler Building, while simultaneously committing to a long-term renegotiation of its lease with the tenant that owns and operates the building."

== Awards ==
Campbell received the Drexel University Centennial Medal as an inaugural a member of the Drexel 100, the Leon J. Obermeyer Award from the City of Philadelphia Board of Education, the 1993 George Arents Award for distinguished alumni of Syracuse University, and several honorary doctorates including Syracuse University. He is a Fellow of the American Association for the Advancement of Science and the New York Academy of Sciences.

== Personal life ==
Campbell was born to Lillian and George Campbell on December 2, 1945, in Richmond, Virginia.

He has been married since 1968 to Mary Schmidt Campbell, who is the former president of Spelman College and dean emerita of New York University's Tisch School of the Arts. Campbell and his wife have three sons and live in Atlanta, Georgia.

Academic offices
Preceded by John Jay Iselin	President of Cooper Union; 2000 - 2011	Succeeded by Jamshed Bharucha
