= University of Tampa =

Private university in Tampa, Florida, US

Coordinates: 27°56′50″N 82°27′55″W

The University of Tampa
- Former name: Tampa Junior College (1931–1933)
- Motto: Esse quam videri
- Motto in English: To be, rather than to seem to be
- Type: Private university
- Established: 1931; 95 years ago
- Accreditation: SACS
- Academic affiliations: AAM, IC&UF, NAICU,
- Endowment: $98.3 million (2025)
- President: Teresa Abi-Nader Dahlberg
- Faculty: 449 Full-time (Fall 2023) and 659 Part-time (Fall 2023)
- Students: 11,047
- Location: Tampa, Florida, U.S.
- Campus: Urban, 110 acres (0.45 km^{2})
- Colors: Red, black, and grey
- Nickname: Spartans
- Sporting affiliations: NCAA Division II – Sunshine State
- Mascot: Spartacus
- Website: ut.edu

The University of Tampa (officially shortened to UTampa; formerly nicknamed UT or Tampa U) is a private university in Tampa, Florida, United States. It is accredited by the Southern Association of Colleges and Schools. UTampa offers more than 200 programs of study, including 19 master's degrees and a broad variety of majors, minors, pre-professional programs and certificates.

The school was initially established in 1931 as a junior college housed in a local high school. In 1933, it became a four-year university and moved onto the grounds of the recently closed Tampa Bay Hotel. The large and lavish central building of Henry B. Plant's resort was converted into Plant Hall, and the Moorish minarets atop the distinctive structure have long been a symbol of both the school and of the city of Tampa in general.

UTampa grew gradually in the 20th century while navigating several periods of financial difficulty, including in the 1970s, when the school decided to fold its locally popular football program due to concerns about costs. Successful fundraising and marketing beginning in the 1990s helped put the school on more stable footing. Since then, it has extensively expanded and modernized its campus while increasing enrollment to over 11,000 students.

== History ==
=== Tampa Junior College ===
In 1931, Frederic Henry Spaulding, the principal of Tampa's Hillsborough High School, established the private "Tampa Junior College" to serve as one of the first institutions of higher education in the Tampa Bay area. The college offered a limited selection of degree programs, with most classes held in the evening on the campus of Hillsborough High School.

=== Move and name change ===
Two years later, the school moved to its current location on the grounds of the recently closed Tampa Bay Hotel, which Henry B. Plant had built in 1891 directly across the Hillsborough River from downtown Tampa. The sprawling resort initially featured a quarter-mile long main building with over 500 guest rooms along with several adjoining buildings and amenities ranging from an indoor pool to a casino to a race track, all spread across six acres of land. After some initial success, however, it struggled to consistently attract enough patrons to make a profit, The city of Tampa purchased the hotel after Plant's death and kept it open by contracting out daily operations to private companies, but it finally shut down in 1931 due to a significant downturn in tourism with the coming of the Great Depression. In 1933, the city agreed to allow Tampa Junior College to move its operations to the former hotel grounds.

With the move to a much larger facility, Tampa Junior College became the University of Tampa (UT) and expanded its course offerings, and Spaulding resigned his position at Hillsborough High School to run the university full time. In 1905, the City of Tampa purchased the Tampa Bay Hotel and 150 acres of land for $125,000. In 1933, the University leased the former Tampa Bay Hotel from the City of Tampa. As part of the agreement between the City and the University, the south wing of the first floor became the Tampa Municipal Museum. The Museum was renamed the Henry B. Plant Museum in 1974.

=== Gradual growth ===
The university grew slowly over the next few decades, becoming a well-respected institution of learning that predominantly served students from the greater Tampa Bay area. In 1951, the university received full accreditation by the Southern Association of Colleges and Schools (SACS). While The University of Tampa succeeded academically, it faced intermittent financial difficulties for several decades. These problems first surfaced soon after its establishment, as the deepening Great Depression decreased enrollment and strained the new school's ability to educate students while continuing to convert much of Plant Hall from hotel rooms into educational spaces. Another crisis several decades later forced a 1974 decision to fold the successful University of Tampa Spartans football program because the school could no longer afford the cost of competing in NCAA Division I-A football.

In 1986, local businessman Bruce Samson dropped out of Tampa's mayoral campaign to become UT's president, a position he was offered due in part to his background in banking and finance. Samson successfully eliminated the school's $1.4 million annual budget deficit through "hardnosed" decisions, including withdrawing from all NCAA Division I sports. However, after he left in 1991 to return to private business, the school again fell into financial difficulties. Declining enrollment led to the return of serious budget deficits, leading to serious cuts to faculty positions and academic programs. UT faced an uncertain future, and some local leaders suggested that the cross-town public University of South Florida should take over operations of the long-time private school.

=== Modern expansions ===
In 1995, the Board of Trustees elected Ronald L. Vaughn, then dean of UT's College of Business, as the school's new president. His initial efforts were aimed at bringing the campus up-to-date with new dorms and a major renovation to the business school. Vaughn also launched the "Take UT to the Top" campaign with the goal of raising $70 million in 10 years and restoring the University's endowment. The campaign raised $83 million, and later observers credit this successful fund drive with saving and modernizing the university. Two important contributions came from the John H. Sykes family of Tampa - a gift of $10 million in 1997 and another donation of $28 million in 2000, which was thought to be the largest such gift to a Florida university at the time.

Since becoming financially secure, the school has purchased adjacent land, added new facilities, and extensively modernized older ones; over $575 million in construction has been completed on campus since 1998. The university has also hired additional faculty, permitting the school to expand its student population while maintaining a 17:1 student-faculty ratio.

== Academics ==
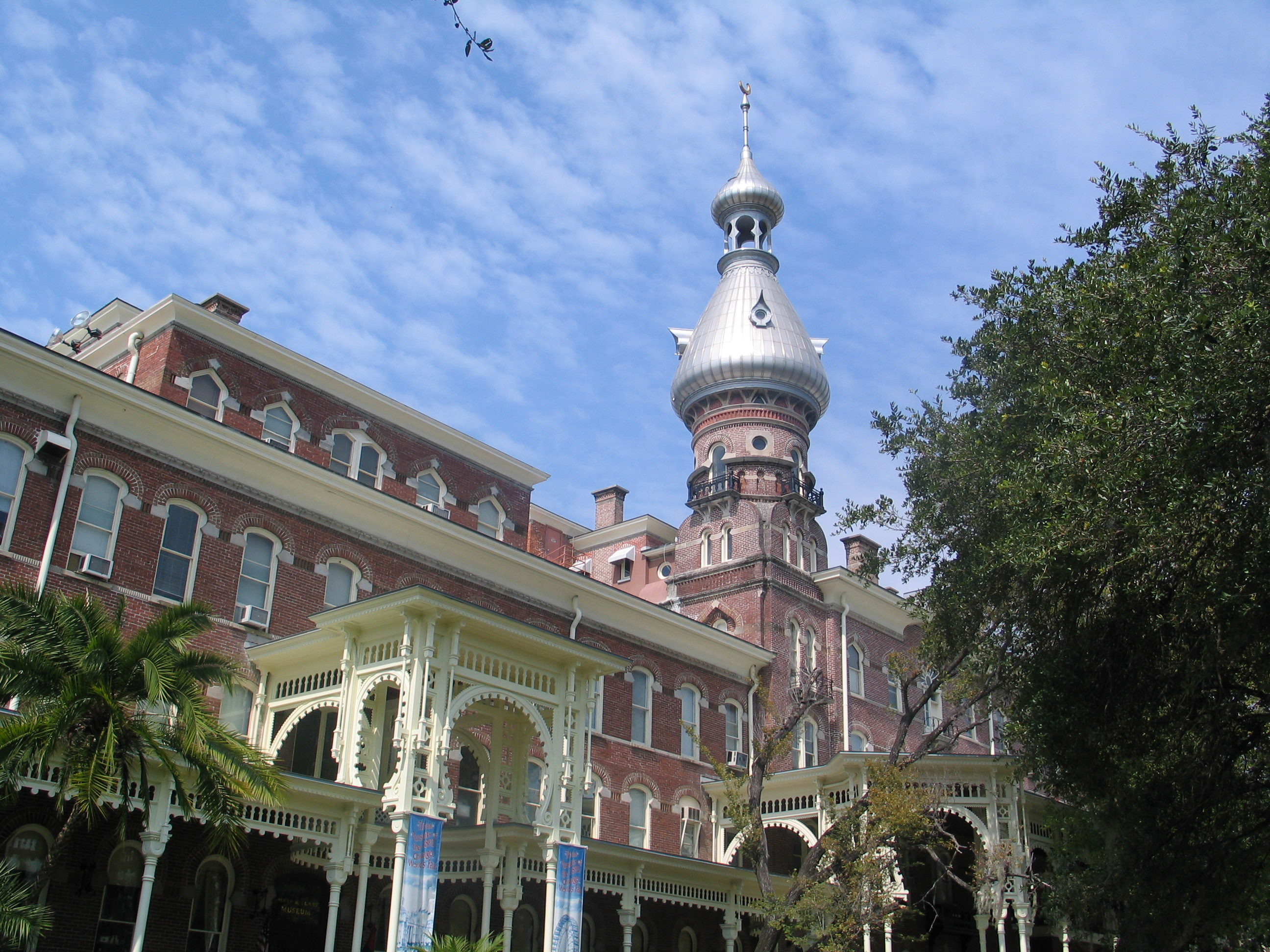
Plant Hall

UT offers 200 areas of study for undergraduate and graduate students. Classes maintain a 17:1 student-faculty ratio. UT employs no teaching assistants.

Some of UT's most popular majors include international business, biology, marketing, marine science, criminology, finance, communication, psychology, sport management, entrepreneurship and nursing. UT recently launched a new major in cybersecurity.

The university is organized into four colleges: College of Arts and Letters; College of Social Sciences, Mathematics and Education; College of Natural and Health Sciences; and the John H. Sykes College of Business, which is accredited at the undergraduate and graduate levels by the Association to Advance Collegiate Schools of Business (AACSB) and constantly ranked among the nation's best business schools.

The University of Tampa has an Honors Program, which "allows students to go beyond the classroom and regular course work to study one-on-one with faculty through enrichment tutorials, Honors Abroad, internships, research and classroom-to-community outreach."

UT also offers a host of international study-abroad options led by UT professors. The university is an associate member of the European Council of International Schools (ECIS).

=== ROTC ===
For UT undergraduates desiring to be commissioned as officers in the U.S. Army following graduation, the campus is home to an Army ROTC unit. For those students wishing to be commissioned as officers in the U.S. Navy, U.S. Marine Corps and U.S. Air Force upon graduation, cross-campus agreements are in place for UT students to affiliate with either the Naval ROTC unit or Air Force ROTC Detachment 158 at the University of South Florida.

=== Rankings ===
The U.S. News & World Report 2025 Best Colleges rankings placed The University of Tampa among the top-tier Regional Universities (South), with its undergraduate business, nursing and psychology programs — including the Sykes College of Business — named “top undergraduate programs” by peer-institution assessment. Additionally, the Sykes College of Business at UTampa was ranked #51 among U.S. business schools in the 2025–2026 cycle by Bloomberg Businessweek, along with sub-rankings of #27 for classroom learning and #34 for entrepreneurship. The Princeton Review continues to recognize UTampa as one of the nation’s best institutions overall and lists Sykes among the top business schools for its on-campus MBA program.

== Campus ==
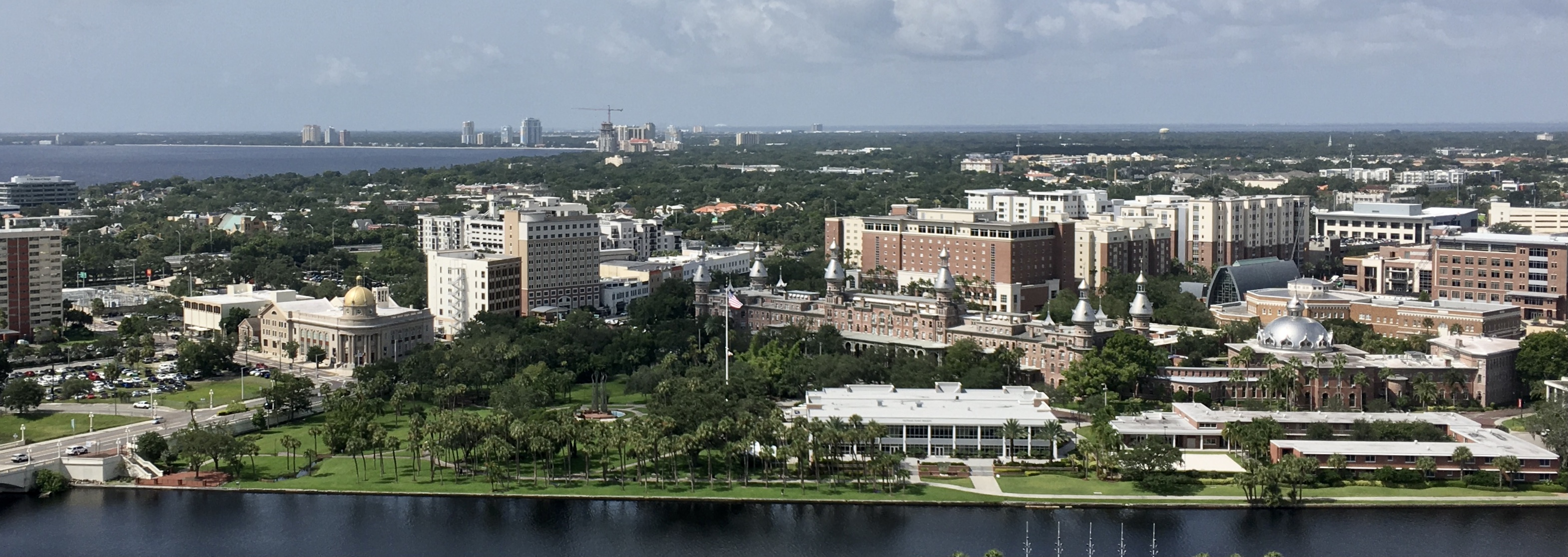
The University of Tampa, west of the Hillsborough River.

UT's campus features 60 buildings on 110 landscaped acres. Plant Hall – a National Historic Landmark built in 1891 by Henry B. Plant – is a leading example of Moorish Revival architecture in the southeastern United States and a focal point of downtown Tampa. In addition to serving as a main location of classrooms and faculty and administrative offices, the building is also home to the Henry B. Plant Museum. The campus also includes the former McKay Auditorium, built in the 1920s and remodeled in the late 1990s to become the Sykes College of Business. In the last 16 years, since 1998, UT has invested approximately $575 million in new residence halls, classrooms, labs and other facilities.

The UT campus is relatively small for a school with 11,047 students. On its east side is the Hillsborough River, and Kennedy Boulevard is to the south. Recent expansions have seen the campus grounds move northward and eastward following purchases of sections of Tampa Preparatory School and vacant lots across the east-side railroad tracks.

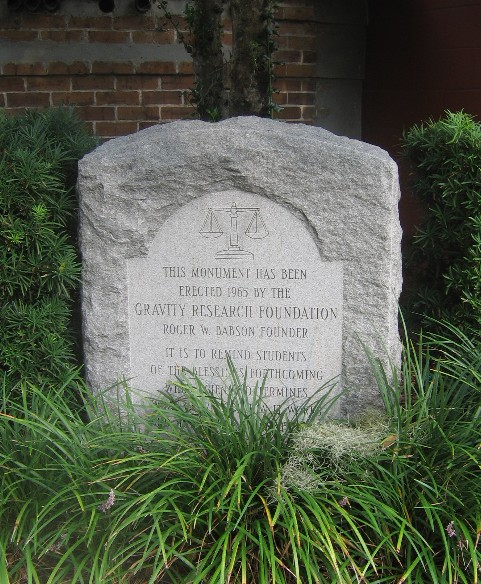
The Babson Anti-Gravity Rock

Although the university is located in a major metropolitan area, palm trees, stately oaks, rose bushes and azaleas can be found in abundance on campus. UT's grounds include Plant Park, a landscaped, palm-tree-lined riverside area in front of Plant Hall's main entrance. It features cannons from Tampa's original harbor fort and the Sticks of Fire sculpture. It also is home to the oak tree under which Hernando de Soto supposedly met the chief of the local Native American tribes upon first coming ashore at what is now Tampa. The campus also includes the former Florida State Fair grounds, where legend has it Babe Ruth hit a home run of 630 feet (190 m), the longest of his career.

UT is also one of few schools with an anti-gravity monument from Roger Babson's Gravity Research Foundation. The "Anti-Gravity Rock", as it is commonly referred to, is located on the crosswalk between the College of Business parking lot and the Macdonald–Kelce Library, at the very end of the Science wing of Plant Hall. The stone's location is somewhat ironic, yet appropriate, given that Babson's scientific views were shared by few if any scientists.

=== Residence halls ===
About 60% of full-time UT students live on the university's main campus. All but 3 of the 12 on-campus residence halls have been built since 1998.

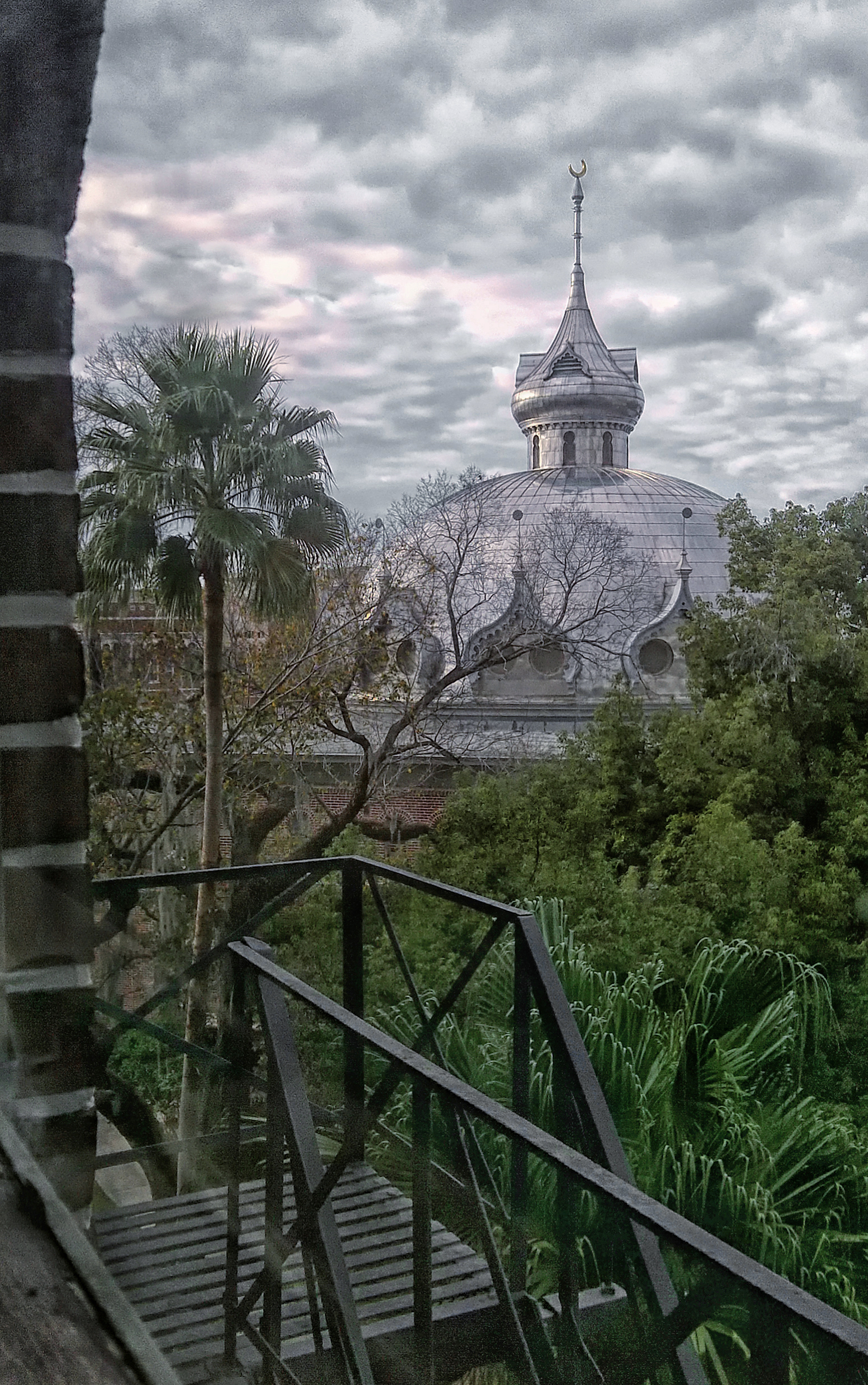
Tampa University Fraternity View

Straz Hall and Palm Apartments offer apartment-style living, with each student having a private room but sharing a bathroom, kitchen and common area with three others. Five dorms, Smiley Hall, McKay Hall, Grand Center, Austin Hall and Vaughn Center, offer traditional dormitory arrangements, with two or three students in a connected suite sharing a bathroom and open living areas. Three halls, Brevard Hall, Morsani Hall and Jenkins Hall, offer a hybrid package with students sharing a common area but without a kitchen. Finally, Urso Hall provides students with what is essentially a studio apartment, a private suite consisting of a bed, closet, kitchenette and restroom. Every residence hall also offers a small assortment of private single rooms.

The Barrymore Hotel, located about 1 mile (1.6 km) from campus, also houses some students. Two students typically stay in each room, which is equipped with two double beds, a bathroom and closet space. UT's wireless internet is available, along with cable television. A shuttle bus provides transportation to/from campus, or students can take the 15-minute walk.

=== Facilities ===
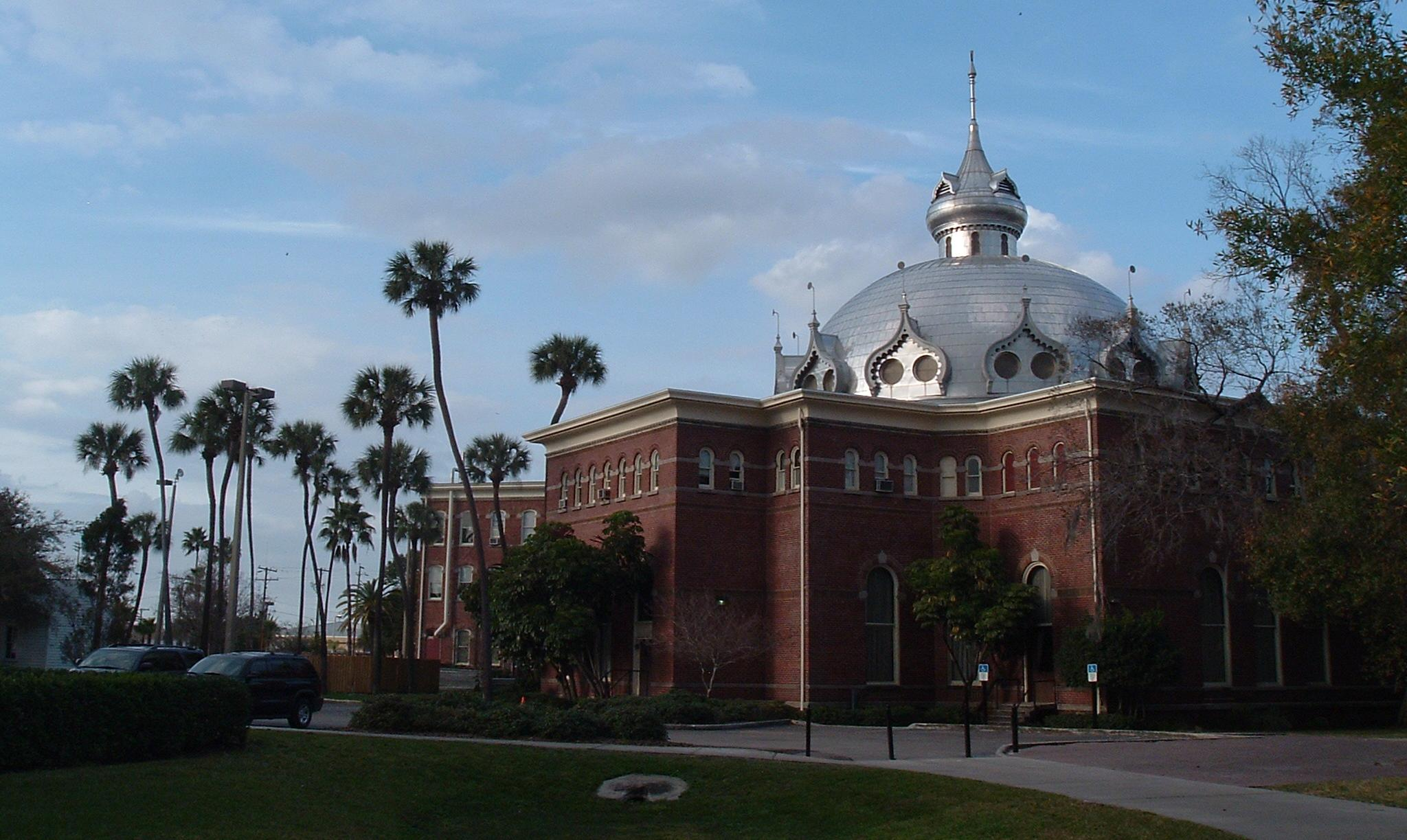
Dome of Plant Hall's Fletcher Lounge

UT has about 50 computer labs and wireless Internet access across campus. The Sykes College of Business, in addition to housing a computer lab, has a stock market lab, equipped with terminals and plasma screen TVs for teaching finance majors the intricacies of the stock market. The College of Natural and Health Sciences maintains a remote marine science research center on Tampa Bay with extensive equipment including research vessels used by students and faculty for studying the ecosystems of Tampa Bay and the Gulf of Mexico.

The Macdonald–Kelce Library houses more than 275,000 books and 65,181 periodicals, as well as online research databases, a computer lab, study rooms and special collections, including Florida military materials, old and rare books, and local history and UT archives. The library also offers reference assistance and bibliographic instruction, interlibrary loans and reserve materials.

For student recreation there is a new Fitness and Recreation Center, a two-floor, 60,000 square foot space featuring six exercise rooms, including indoor cycling, functional training and yoga. There is also an on-campus aquatic center, the pool has a deep swimming section for scuba classes; it is open to students at limited times. UT offers sand volleyball courts, outdoor basketball courts, a fully equipped intramural sports gym with indoor courts, tennis courts, a ropes course, a soccer field, a running track, a multi-use intramural field and a fully equipped workout center. The university has been recognized for being a green business, by the US Green Building Council with several facilities holding an LEED certification.

UT's theater department hosts student produced and acted plays across Kennedy Boulevard in the historic Falk Theatre. Falk also hosts large academic gatherings, student productions and concerts. In 2003 Falk Theatre was featured as a setting in the film The Punisher.

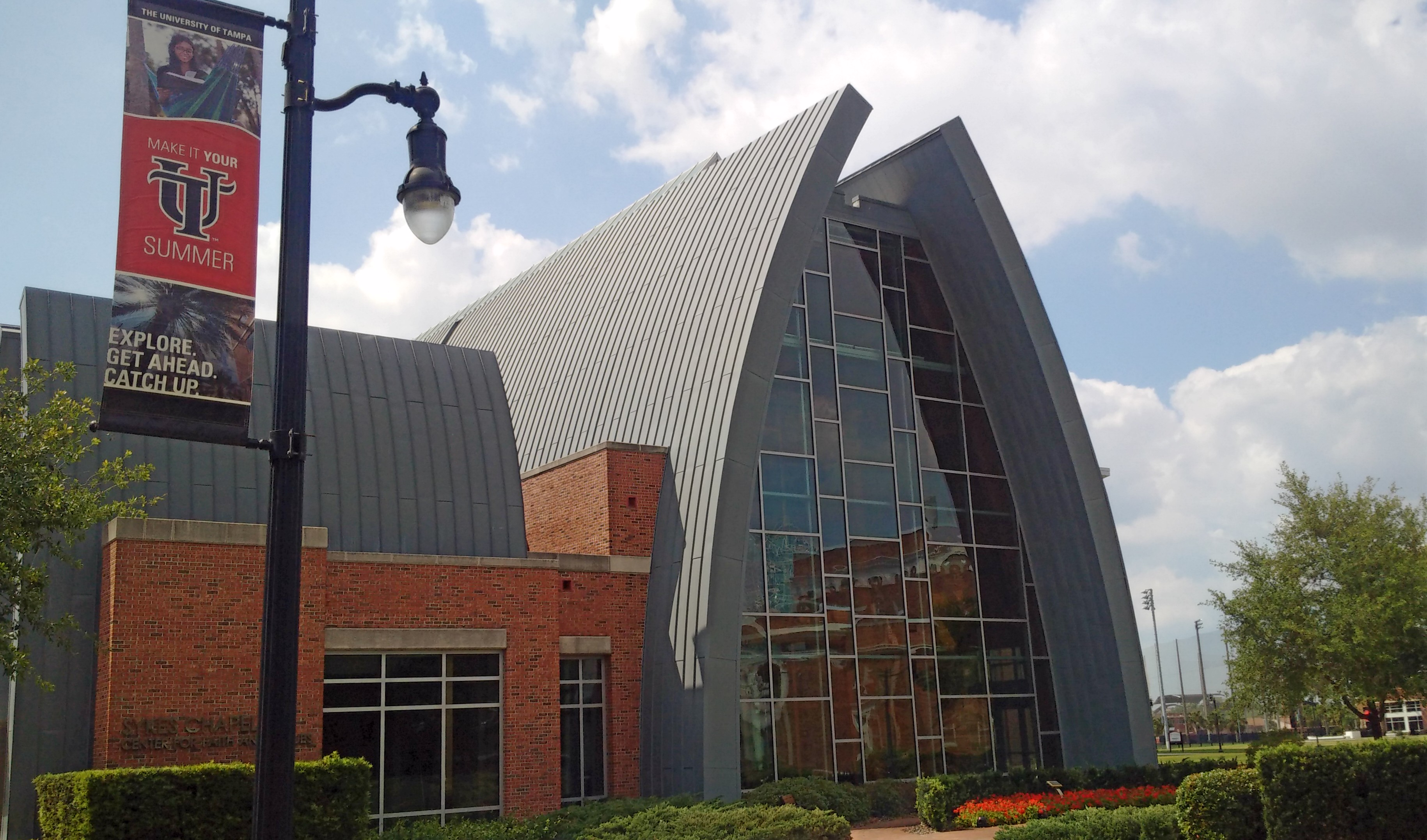
Sykes Chapel

The non-denominational Sykes Chapel and Center for Faith and Values includes a 250-seat main hall, meeting and meditation rooms, pipe organ by Dobson Pipe Organ Builders, a plaza and 60-bell musical sculpture/fountain.

The Bob Martinez Athletics Center received substantial upgrades during recent improvements throughout the university.

== Students ==
UT has approximately 11,047 students from 50 U.S. states and most of the world’s countries. A significant number of students come from northern and northeastern states while about 15% of the student body is made up of international students. Students from Florida make up about half of the student body. 60% of full-time students live in campus housing.

== Athletics ==
The University of Tampa competes at the Division II level in the Sunshine State Conference (SSC). The school's mascot is the Spartan.

Spartan teams have won a combined total of 27 NCAA Division II National Titles, as follows: ten in baseball (1992, 1993, 1998, 2006, 2007, 2013, 2015, 2019, 2024, 2025), three in men's soccer (1981, 1994, 2001), two in golf (1987, 1988), three in volleyball (2006, 2014, 2018), four in beach volleyball (2019, 2023, 2024, 2025), one in women's soccer (2007), one in men's lacrosse (2022), two in women’s lacrosse (2024, 2025) and one in men's swimming and diving (2023).

UT presently competes in baseball, men's and women's basketball, beach volleyball, men's and women's cheerleading/dance, men's and women's cross country, men's and women's golf, men's and women's lacrosse, women's rowing, men's and women's soccer, softball, men's and women's swimming, women's tennis, men's and women's track, and women's volleyball. UT athletes are among the top in the SSC in terms of All-American, All-Region, and All-Conference players along with numerous Commissioner's Honor Roll recipients. The school has recently built dedicated stadiums for baseball, softball, soccer, track, and lacrosse that rival many Division I facilities. The men's club hockey team competes in the American Collegiate Hockey Association (ACHA). UT's equestrian team competes in the Intercollegiate Horse Show Association (IHSA).

=== Tampa Spartans football ===
The University of Tampa fielded the first college football team in the Tampa Bay area in 1933, soon after the school was founded. The "Tampa U" Spartans played at Plant Field their first three seasons, which had to be shared with many community events. In 1936, the school built its own facility in Phillips Field, which was named for local businessman I. W. Phillips, who donated a plot of land adjacent to the university for the stadium site.

For over 30 years, the Spartans primarily scheduled games against other smaller southern colleges as an independent in the National Association of Intercollegiate Athletics (NAIA) and its forerunners. In 1967, the school decided to compete at the highest level of college football in NCAA Division I and moved their home field to Tampa Stadium, which had just been completed. The Spartans produced several NFL stars in this era including John Matuszak and Freddie Solomon while building a sizeable local following. However, the school had only about 2000 students in the early 1970s and struggled to afford the expenses of a maintaining a major college football program.

When Tampa was awarded a new NFL franchise in 1974 (the eventual Tampa Bay Buccaneers), Tampa U president B.D. Owens reported to the university's board that attendance at Spartans' games was likely to decrease, further impacting the school's finances. Accordingly, the board voted to fold the Spartan football program after the 1974 season. The football program finished with an all-time record of 201–160–12.

== Student media ==
UT's undergraduate literary journal, Neon (originally Quilt), has been published by students since 1978. Neon hosts numerous events throughout the academic year, including open mic nights, which are open to the public. Yearly, Neon hosts a prominent writer for "Coffeehouse Weekend." Recent visitors have included Kate Greenstreet and Dorothy Allison.

Other student-run publications include The Minaret newspaper, The Moroccan yearbook, and Splice Journal, which showcases student work in communication, art and culture.

UT also has a student radio station (WUTT 1080) and television station (UT-TV).

== Fraternities and sororities ==
The first Greek groups appeared on campus in the early 1950s. In 2024, about 21% of UT's undergraduates were members of 27 fraternities and sororities.

== Notable alumni and attendees ==
Notable people who attended the University of Tampa include:

- Braulio Alonso, educator, first Hispanic president of the National Education Association
- Steve Boyett, author and DJ
- Alejandra Caraballo, civil rights attorney and LGBTQ advocate
- Jane Castor, mayor of Tampa
- Chyna (Joan Laurer), actress and professional wrestler
- Danielle Dixson, marine ecologist at the University of Delaware
- Noah Fearnley, actor
- Matt Frevola, UFC fighter
- Connie May Fowler, author
- Dick Greco, four-time mayor of Tampa
- Amy Hill Hearth, author
- Dennis James Kennedy, Presbyterian pastor and author
- Bob Martinez, mayor of Tampa and 40th governor of Florida
- Tino Martinez, Major League Baseball player
- John Matuszak, National Football League player and actor
- Brett James McMullen, retired United States Air Force General Officer
- Leon McQuay, National Football League player
- Pascal Milien, professional football player
- MoistCr1tikal (Charles White), entertainer and Internet celebrity
- Juan Camilo Mouriño, former Secretary of the Interior of Mexico
- Paul "Mr. Wonderful" Orndorff, professional wrestler
- Lou Piniella, Major League Baseball player
- Pete Peterson, retired U.S. Air Force colonel, fighter pilot, Vietnam War prisoner of war, former U.S. Representative from Florida and former U.S. ambassador to Vietnam
- "Dirty" Dick Slater, professional wrestler
- Freddie Solomon, National Football League player

== See also ==
- Independent Colleges and Universities of Florida
