= Levinson =

Levinson is an Ashkenazi Jewish surname meaning "son of Levi". Notable people with the surname include:

- Aaron Levinson (born 1963), American producer, musician, composer and record label owner
- André Levinson (1887–1933), French dance journalist
- Anna Levinson (1939–2015), German entomologist
- Arik Levinson, American economist
- Arthur D. Levinson (born 1950), American businessman
- Barry Levinson (1932–1987), American film producer
- Barry Levinson (born 1942), American film director and screenwriter
- Bernard M. Levinson (born 1952), American biblical scholar
- Boris Levinson (1919–2002), Russian theatre and film actor
- Dan Levinson (born 1965), American jazz musician
- Dana Aliya Levinson (born 1992), American television writer, actress, and Jewish transgender advocate
- Daniel Levinson (1920–1994), American psychologist
- Daniel R. Levinson (born 1949), American attorney and government official
- David Levinson, multiple people
- Ed Levinson (1898–1981), American criminal
- Eric L. Levinson, American judge
- Eugene Levinson, American double-bassist
- Feodor Levinson-Lessing (1861–1939), Russian geologist
- Frank Levinson, American entrepreneur and investor
- Gerald Levinson (born 1951), American composer
- Harold Levinson, American dyslexia researcher
- Harry Levinson (1922–2012), American psychologist
- Herb Levinson (1929–2012), American actor
- Hermann Levinson (1924–2013), German biologist and physiologist
- Horace Clifford Levinson (1895–1968), American mathematician
- Jan Levinson, fictional character (The Office)
- Jay Conrad Levinson (1933–2013), American business writer
- Jerrold Levinson (born 1948), American philosophy professor
- Jessica Levinson, American law professor
- Joel Moss Levinson (born 1979/1980), American comedian
- Jonathan Levinson, fictional character (Buffy the Vampire Slayer)
- Justin Levinson (born 1985), American singer-songwriter
- Leonard Levinson (1904–1974), American radio writer and author.
- Mark Levinson, multiple people
- Mon Levinson (1926–2014) was an American sculptor
- Nan Levinson (born 1949), American writer, journalist, and teacher
- Nancy Levinson, American editor and writer
- Nathan Levinson (1888–1952), American sound engineer
- Norman Levinson (1912–1975), American mathematician
- Paul Levinson (born 1947), American author
- Peter Levinson (1934–2008), American music publicist and biographer
- Richard Levinson (1934–1987), American writer and producer
- Rina Levinson (1927–2021), Israeli pilot
- Robert Levinson (born 1948; disappeared 2007), American DEA and FBI agent, CIA Asset
- Ronald B. Levinson (1896–1980), American philosopher
- Salmon Levinson (1865–1941), Attorney active in the Peace Movement in early 1900's
- Sam Levinson (born 1985), American actor
- Sandra Levinson, American executive director and curator
- Sanford Levinson (born 1941), American law professor
- Sara Levinson (born 1950), American entrepreneur and former executive
- Shimon Levinson (born 1933), Israeli intelligence officer and spy
- Stephen C. Levinson (born 1947), British linguist
- Stephen E. Levinson (born 1944), American engineer
- Steven H. Levinson (born 1946), American judge
- Tamara Levinson (born 1976), American dance choreographer and retired rhythmic gymnast
- Tim Levinson, Australian rapper
- Wendy Levinson, Canadian physician and academic

The variants Levinsohn and Lewinsohn may refer to the following notable people:

- Isaac Baer Levinsohn (1788–1860), Ukrainian-Hebrew scholar and writer
- Joshua Lewinsohn (1833–?), Russian teacher and writer
- Ross Levinsohn (born 1962/1963), American media executive

== See also ==
- Levenson, Leveson, Levison, and Lewisohn
- Livingstone (name)
