= Levenson =

Levenson is a surname. It may be a variant of the Scottish surname Livingstone. The Livingstone are a Scottish branch of the Irish Dunleavy/MacNulty royals. Levenson (and Levinson, Levinsohn, etc.) may also be a Jewish surname, meaning "son of Levi" - referring to one of the twelve tribes in Israel. Levenson may refer to:

- Alan Levenson, American Jewish scholar
- Arthur Levenson (1914–2007), American cryptographer who worked at Bletchley Park during World War II
- Barry Levenson, American blues musician and record producer
- Barton Paul Levenson (born 1960), American science fiction writer
- Boris Levenson (1884–1947), Romanian composer
- Bruce Levenson (born 1949), American businessman and philanthropist
- Christopher Levenson (born 1934), Canadian poet
- Claude B. Levenson (1938–2010), French journalist and writer
- Dan Levenson (artist) (born 1972), American contemporary artist
- Dan Levenson (musician) (born c. 1955), American musician and storyteller
- Ellie Levenson (born 1978), British journalist
- Emanuel Levenson (1916–1998), American classical musician
- Fredrick Levenson (1945–2012), American author and psychoanalyst
- Gavan Levenson (born 1953), South African golfer
- Jeanine Levenson, known as Jeanine Tesori (born 1961), American composer of musicals
- Jill Levenson, American social worker
- Jon D. Levenson, American Hebrew Bible scholar
- Joseph R. Levenson (1920–1969), American historian
- Laurie Levenson (born 1956), American lawyer and professor
- Mark Levenson, American musical director
- Noah Levenson (born 1981), American computer programmer and writer
- Robert Levenson (1897–1961), American lyricist
- Sam Levenson (1911–1980), American humorist, writer, television host and journalist
- Silvia Levenson (born 1957), Argentine glass artist and activist
- Stan Levenson (1938–2016), Canadian sprinter
- Steven Levenson (born 1984), American playwright and television writer
- Thomas Levenson, American science writer and academic

== See also ==
- MacDunleavy (dynasty)
- Leveson, Levison, and Levinson
