= Levison =

Levison is a surname. Notable people with the surname include:

- Alan Wendell Levison, birth name of Alan Wendell Livingston (1917–2009), American music executive
- Beth Levison, American documentary film producer and director
- Catherine Levison, American writer and public speaker
- Charles Gerstle Levison, birth name of Charles Lane (1905–2007), American actor
- David Levison (1919–2012), Scottish minister
- Ejnar Levison (1880–1970), Danish fencer
- Harold F. Levison (born 1959), planetary scientist
- Iain Levison (born 1963), Scottish-American writer
- Jacob Harold Levison, birth name of Jay Livingston (1915–2001), American songwriter
- Mary Levison, (1923–2011), Church of Scotland minister
- Nat Levison, British actor
- Olivia Levison (1847–1894), Danish author and writer
- Sarah Rachel Russell (1814–1880), British con artist who went by Levison
- Stanley Levison (1912–1979), American businessman
- Wilhelm Levison (1876–1947), German medievalist

== See also ==
- Levison Wood (born 1982), British Army officer and explorer
- Levenson, Leveson, Levinson, and Lewisohn
