= Street Smart =

Street Smart may refer to:

- Street Smart (video game), a 1989 arcade game by SNK
- Street Smart (1987 film), a film with Christopher Reeve and Morgan Freeman
- Street Smart (2026 film), an American drama film
- Street Smart (TV series), a 2018 Australian television series
- Street Smart (book), a book about private highways
- StreetSmart, the former channel of British YouTuber, Max Fosh
- Melway Perth, an Australian street directory formerly known as StreetSmart

== See also ==
- Street Smarts, an American game show
- Streetsmartz, a 2005 Australian television series
- Streetwise (disambiguation)
- Common sense or "street smarts", a basic understanding of the mechanisms of the world
