= David Pearl =

David Pearl may refer to:

- David Pearl (businessman) (born 1945), British property developer
- David Pearl (lawyer) (born 1944), British lawyer and member of the Judicial Appointments Commission
- David Pearl (performer) (born 1960), British singer, author, director and public speaker
