= Chris Barez-Brown =

British author and entrepreneur

- Born: 12 July 1968 (age 57) Herefordshire, Britain
- Occupation: Author
- Language: English

Chris Barez-Brown is a British author and entrepreneur. He is best known for his books "Upping Your Elvis", "Free! Love Your Work Love Your Life", "Wake Up!," and "Shine", and was Penguin (publisher)’s bestselling author in 2014. His work has also been covered in mainstream press including BBC, The Guardian, The Sunday Times, and various other publications. In 2010, Baréz-Brown established the consultancy Upping Your Elvis. The organization collaborates with Nike, Unilever, Britvic, Diageo, The Guardian, Mediacom and ITV. In 2012 Baréz-Brown collaborated with friend and fellow speaker David Pearl to develop a not-for-profit movement called Street Wisdom. Chris is also the founder of Talk It Out, a wellbeing and productivity business, with a mission to put a dent into global suffering by offering wellbeing support to anyone in the world, for free.

== Personal life ==
Chris is married to entrepreneur, Anna Barez-Brown with whom he shares two daughters. One of which, is British Drill Rapper, Harvi3.

== Books ==
- How to have Kick-Ass Ideas – 2006, Harper Collins.
- Shine. How to Survive and Thrive at Work – 2011, Penguin (publisher).
- Free! Love Your Life, Love Your Work – 2014, Penguin (publisher).
- Wake Up! Escaping a Life on Autopilot – 2017, Penguin (publisher).
- Upping Your Elvis – 2021, Whitefox (publisher)
