= Streetwise =

Streetwise may refer to:

== Knowledgeable ==
- Streetwise, possessing knowledge of youth culture, also called "street"
- Streetwise, possessing know-how (practical knowledge), as opposed to ivory tower or book knowledge, knowledge on how to succeed through life, or generally how to avoid the pitfalls
- Streetwise, possessing common sense, a basic understanding of things

== Films ==
- Streetwise (1984 film), an American documentary by Martin Bell
- Streetwise (1998 film), an American crime thriller
- Streetwise (2021 film), a Chinese crime drama

== Arts, entertainment, and media ==
- Streetwise (album), a 1991 album by American classical pianist Richard Kastle
- Streetwise (TV series), a teenage courier delivery drama television series broadcast on Children's ITV from 1989 and 1992
- Streetwise (Transformers), the name of several robot superhero characters in the Transformers robot superhero franchise
- StreetWise, a Chicago newspaper

== Brands and enterprises ==
- Rover Streetwise, a small hatchback made by the MG Rover Group

== See also ==
- Savoir faire (disambiguation)
- Street Smarts, a TV game show
- Street Wisdom, an international nonprofit institution
