= Titanic Symphony =

Composition by Richard Kastle

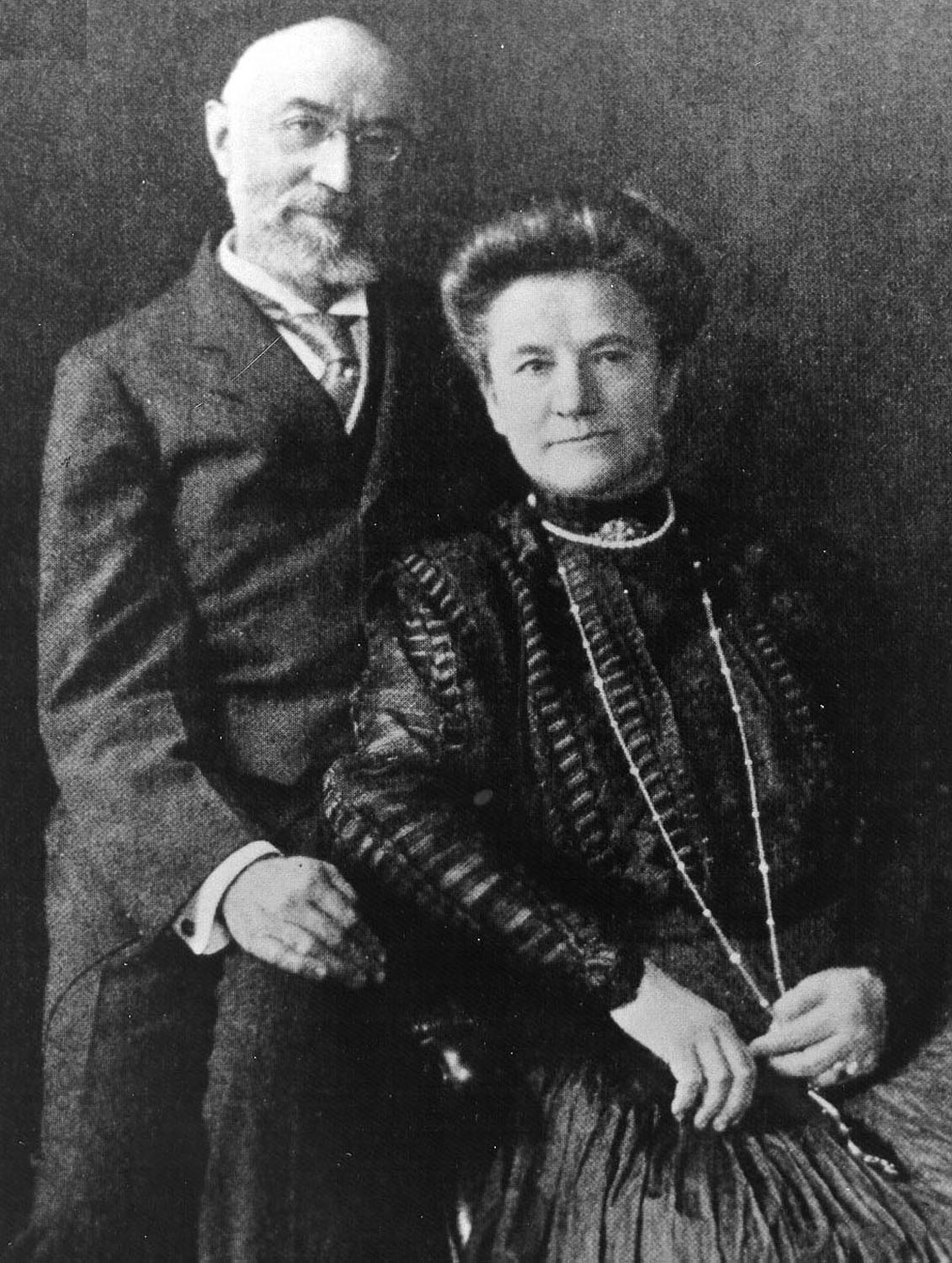
Isidor and Ida Straus. The symphony's third movement is a tribute to Ida Straus.

Titanic Symphony, the third symphony composed by Richard Kastle, is based on the sinking of the RMS Titanic. It is a four-movement piece for orchestra that begins with the ship leaving the dock on her maiden voyage. Its last movement describes the ship's sinking. Because Kastle felt the sea's rhythm was vital to the piece's creation, he composed it on Venice Beach, where he lived in the late 1980s.

== Movements ==
There are four movements:

1. Her Maiden Voyage
2. And the band played on...
3. Ida's Love Theme
4. The Sinking

== Performances ==
The symphony was premiered on November 6, 1999, at Alice Tully Hall, Lincoln Center with Kastle conducting the orchestra. He recorded “Ida’s Love Theme” as a solo piece for piano on his Royce Concerto album in 1992, and performed the piano arrangement of the third movement on a national tour with comedian Jay Leno.
