= Royce Concerto =

Studio album by Richard Kastle
- Released: 1997
- Recorded: Minnesota Public Radio, Studio M, St. Paul, MN; Blackheath Hall, London
- Genre: Classical
- Length: 61:23
- Label: Yum Recordings
- Producer: Steve Barnett

Richard Kastle chronology
Streetwise (album) (1991)	Royce Concerto (1997)	Ear Candy (1998)

Royce Concerto is the second studio album by American classical pianist and composer Richard Kastle. It is also a three movement concerto for piano and orchestra, that was composed by Kastle and included in the album. The Philharmonia Orchestra also performs on the album released by Yum Recordings on September 30, 1997.

== Concerto ==
This concerto was created after Kastle was invited to perform at UCLA’s Royce Hall. After the invitation, he went to work on some music designed especially for the venue and its difficult acoustics. By the time he finished the Royce Concerto and before the contracts were signed, organizers had changed their minds about booking him. He refused to change the name.

== Recording ==
It was recorded by Virgin Records in 1992 using the same production team and studio as Streetwise. The piano was recorded and mixed a Minnesota Public radio, Studio M, St. Paul, MN. The orchestra was recorded at Blackheath Halls in London.

== Track listing ==
- Music composed by Richard Kastle (except track 12)
  1. Boardwalk Rondo
  Royce Concerto (tracks 2–4)
  2. Adagio Molto
  3. Andante
  4. Moderato
  5. Mirror Pool (Piano Concerto No 6)
  6. Desert Sky
  7. Ida's Love Theme (Titanic Symphony)
  8. Adagio
  9. Tempest
  10. Nocturne in A Minor
  11. Prelude in E
  12. Polonaise in A Flat, Frédéric Chopin

== Credits ==
- Executive Producer: Roger Holdredge
- Produced by Steve Barnett
- Engineered by Preston Smith
- Orchestrated by Richard Kastle
- Conducted by Steve Barnett
- Design: Wj Mauer
- Photography: Frank Franca
- Tenor Saxophone soloist on Desert Sky: Brian Grivna
