= When the Lilies Bloom in France Again =

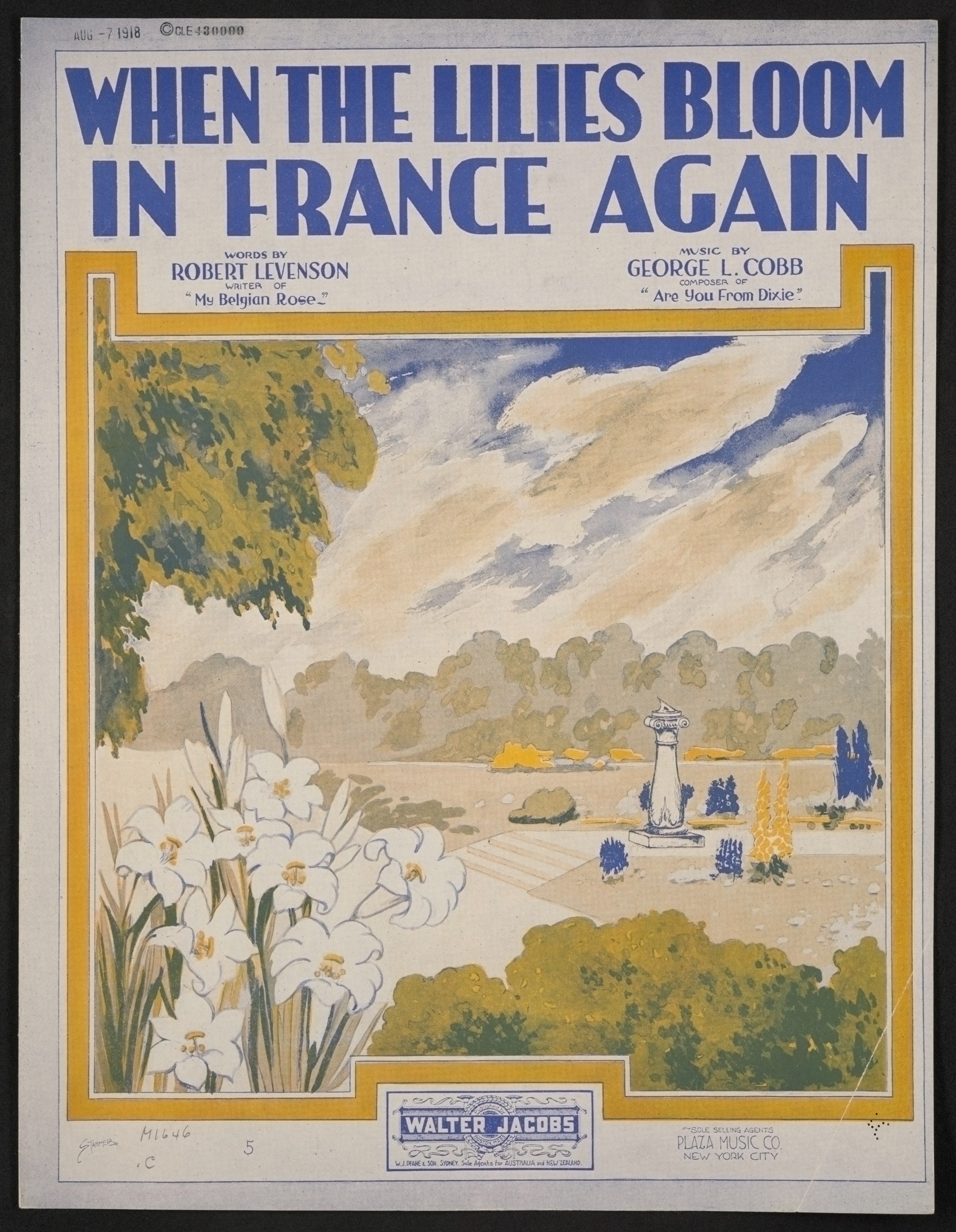

Song
- Released: 1918
- Composer(s): George L. Cobb
- Lyricist(s): Robert Levenson
- Producer(s): Walter Jacobs

"When the Lilies Bloom in France Again" is a World War I era song released in 1918. Robert Levenson wrote the lyrics. George L. Cobb composed the music. It was published by Walter Jacobs of New York City and Boston, Massachusetts. There are two versions of the sheet music cover. One was designed by Rose Starmer. The cover is described as an "artistic words only cover." Another cover is a painting of a garden, with lilies in the foreground. The song was written for both voice and piano.

The song uses nature as a metaphor to assure listeners of hope and that everything will be restored at the end of the war. It also highlights a promise a soldier makes: "When the lilies bloom in France again," the soldier will return to his sweetheart. The song starts by describing lilies growing and birds singing in France. This scenery is now bare, but "the flowers will bloom again, That's a part of every soldier's vow." The chorus is as follows:

When the lilies bloom in France again
And the fields are white as snow
Then our work will be done
And I'll come back to the one
Who'll be waiting for me I know
Then we'll all see the silver lining
That will soon pierce the dark clouds through
When the lilies bloom in France again,
I'll come back to you, sweetheart
