= 147 Squadron (Israel) =

Israeli military unit

- טייסת האיל הנוגח
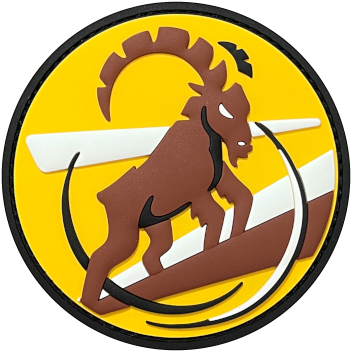
- Active: 1956, 1967, 1978–1986, 2024–
- Country: Israel
- Branch: Israeli Air Force
- Role: Unmanned
- Nickname: Goring Ram / Flying Ibex
- Engagements: Suez Crisis; Six-Day War; Twelve-Day War

Aircraft flown
- Attack: Fouga Magister; A-4 Skyhawk
- Trainer: Boeing-Stearman Kaydet

147 Squadron, often referred to as the Flying Ibex or Goring Ram squadron, is a former unit of the Israeli Air Force. Fielding IAF Flight Academy aircraft, it flew the Boeing-Stearman Kaydet during the 1956 Suez Crisis and the Fouga Magister during the 1967 Six-Day War, in the course of which it suffered six fatalities. Between 1978 and 1986 it flew the A-4 Skyhawk.

== Formation ==
In January 1953 the IAF formed the flight academy's fleet of Stearmans into a reserve liaison and surveillance unit, to be activated in times of emergency. Seconded to 100 Squadron, the unit was initially designated 1000 Squadron, but was redesignated 147 Squadron on January 1, 1955. It was activated on October 27, 1956, for the Suez Crisis. Commanded by Captain Meir Shefer, the unit had 25 serviceable aircraft but only 12 pilots, consisting of both reserves and qualified students and including Rina Levinson, one of a handful of female pilots serving with the IAF. 147 Squadron flew 401 sorties during the war, clocking 233 hours. Flying from Ramla, next to IAF headquarters, the squadron flew communications, liaison, transport, patrol and reconnaissance missions, operating during both day and night. Once the fighting was over, the aircraft reverted to their original training role and the squadron was deactivated.

== Six-Day War ==
The Fouga Magister entered service with the IAF Flight Academy in 1960, and on November 1, 1961, 147 Squadron was reformed to operate the type during emergencies.

The squadron was reactivated at Hatzerim in May 1967, on the eve of the Six-Day War. Commanded by Major Arieh Ben-Or, there were 44 aircraft and 42 pilots on hand on the morning of June 5, when Israel launched Operation Focus, the strike that started the war. While the Fougas were initially slated to participate in attacks on the Egyptian air bases at El Arish and Jabl Libni, their light armament and lack of effective combat range led to their reassignment to the deception, interdiction and close air support roles. Thus, while the majority of IAF combat aircraft were en route to their respective targets in Egypt and the Sinai, 147 Squadron Fougas took to the air flying seemingly routine training missions and generating seemingly routine radio traffic to give the impression that Israel was on a low state of alert. Other Fougas, however, were making their way to attack Egyptian troop concentrations along the front in support of the Israeli push into the Sinai. The first strikes targeted a pair of Egyptian radar stations near El-Arish, during which the squadron suffered its first fatality of the war, deputy squadron leader Arnon Livnat.

With the IAF's combat squadrons occupied by Focus, 147 Squadron's Fougas were effectively the only attack aircraft available to provide support for IDF ground forces. They subsequently attacked Egyptian artillery in the northern Sinai, convoys, supply trains and troop concentrations. 147 Squadron was also active on other fronts, and late on June 5 the Fougas went into action against the Jordanians in the West Bank. Several aircraft struck Jordanian artillery that had been shelling various points in Israel, tanks operating in the Jenin region were attacked as well, while the squadron also managed to halt a Jordanian armored brigade attempting to intervene in the heavy fighting under way in Jerusalem. Three further aircraft and their pilots were lost.

147 Squadron returned to the West Bank on the morning of June 6, flying 104 sorties and firing over 1200 rockets at Jordanian targets throughout the region. One aircraft was lost and its pilot killed by the time the squadron was ordered to stand down during the latter half of the day. Having flown an average of 5 sorties on June 5, 147 Squadron pilots flew an average of 3 on June 6. Operations on the Jordanian front resumed the following day, during which Iraqi reinforcements were attacked, but on June 8 the squadron was informed that its role in the fighting had come to an end. Fighting on the Golan Heights, however, prompted a change of heart, and on the morning of June 9 147 Squadron deployed to Ramat David. The first formation to head into action over the Golan, led by squadron leader Ben-Or, encountered heavy Syrian anti-aircraft fire. Ben-Or was killed and further Fouga missions were promptly canceled.

The squadron claimed 128 tanks destroyed during the war, 43 other armored vehicles, 292 lorries, 2 trains, 47 artillery pieces, and 4 anti-aircraft guns. 419 sorties had been flown and 4,384 rockets expended, including Egyptian stocks captured at the air base at El Arish. Slow, lightly armed, lacking both defensive armor and ejection seats, six Magisters and their pilots had been lost, including both the squadron leader and his deputy. Virtually every single aircraft suffered battle damage. The end of the war led to the deactivation of the squadron and the Fouga Magisters were henceforth restricted to the training role.

== Flying the A-4 Skyhawk ==
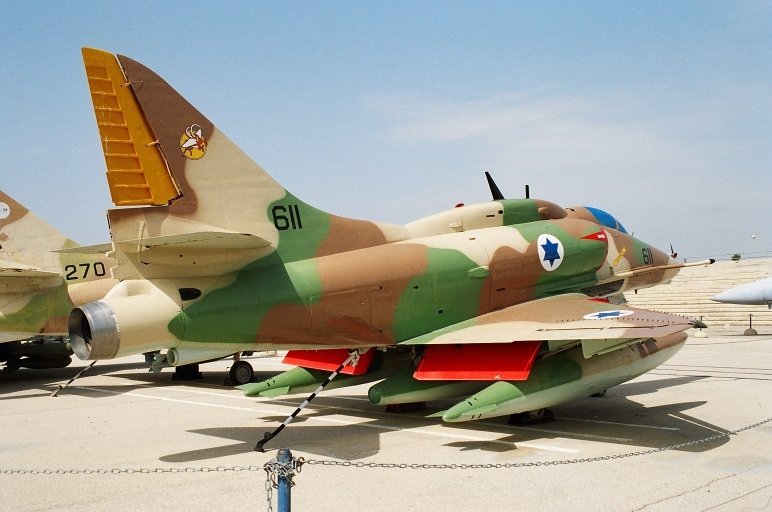
147 Squadron A-4 Skyhawk at the Israeli Air Force Museum, Hatzerim

147 Squadron was reactivated once again at Hatzerim on August 6, 1978, commanded by Hanoch Patishi. Operating a mix of A-4Es, A-4Fs and A-4Ns, it was the IAF's eighth and last A-4 Skyhawk squadron. Initially conceived as a unit manned by reservists with a skeleton crew of air force regulars, this arrangement was soon found unsatisfactory by both groups and the squadron reverted to the usual IAF combination of regulars, emergency postings and reserves. It adopted an emblem depicting a ram with wings against a yellow background, an all-yellow rudder and yellow-tipped external fuel tanks.

The squadron flew its first operational mission on April 24, 1979, when four aircraft struck Palestinian artillery north of Tyre. In subsequent years the squadron routinely took part in IAF operations in Lebanon, as fighting intensified in that country. In 1981 it was transformed into a reserve squadron, maintained by a small cadre of air force regulars, and was finally disbanded in 1986, its A-4Ns passing to 102 Squadron.

== 2024 and onwards ==
The squadron has been reformed and operates the Elbit Hermes 900 UAV.
