= The Angel God Sent from Heaven =

"The Angel God Sent From Heaven"
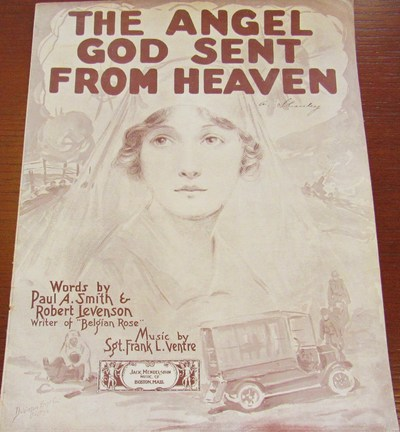

Song
- Published: 1918 by Jack Mendelsohn Music
- Genre: Wartime song
- Composer(s): Frank L. Ventre
- Lyricist(s): Paul A. Smith, Robert Levenson

"The Angel God Sent From Heaven" is a World War I era American song published in 1918. Frank L. Ventre composed the music, while Paul A. Smith and Robert Levenson wrote the lyrics. It was published by Jack Mendelsohn Music Company in Boston, Massachusetts. The song was written for both voice and piano. The cover was illustrated by the Dobinson Engraving Company. On the cover is a drawing of a nurse. Under her picture is a car and soldiers.

The lyrics are told from the point of view of a soldier's mother. Although she is concerned about her son's safety, she doesn't worry because "God sent a shining angel to take [her] place". The angel she refers to is a Red Cross nurse. The chorus is as follows:

God sent a shining Angel
To take your mother's place
She drives away all sorrow
There's sunshine in her face
God bless her!
That's why I never worry
She'll keep you safe from harm
For the angel God sent down from Heaven
Wears a Red Cross on her arm

Pritzker Military Museum & Library has a copy of the sheet music.
