= Janet Lusk =

Scottish social worker

Janet Theodora Lusk OBE
- Born: 27 April 1924; Oxford, England
- Died: 20 June 1994 (aged 70); Edinburgh, Scotland
- Education: University of Edinburgh; University of Birmingham
- Occupation: social worker
- Employer: Guild of Service
- Known for: pioneering children's social care practice in Scotland serving on the Houghton Committee on Adoption
- Family: Mary Levison (sister)

Janet Theodora Lusk OBE (27 April 1924 – 20 June 1994) was a Scottish social worker who was a pioneer of social care in Scotland, Director of the Guild of Service (1962 – 1984) and the first female Convener of the Scottish Council for Voluntary Organisations (1984 – 1990).

== Early life ==
Janet Lusk was born in Oxford on 27 April 1924. She was the fifth and youngest child of Mary Theodora Colville and her husband, Reverend David Colville Lusk (1881–1960). Her father was ordained in the United Free Church, and at the time of her birth, was the Chaplain to the Presbyterian members of the University of Oxford. One of her siblings was Rev Dr Mary Irene Levison (1923–2011). Her family relocated to Edinburgh when her father became minister at West Coates Church. She attended St Leonard's School, St Andrews until 1942, and then joined the Auxiliary Territorial Service. After the war she studied French and Spanish at the University of Edinburgh, followed in 1956 with a post-graduate qualification in child care from the University of Birmingham.

== Early career ==
Lusk started her career in social work at Edinburgh Children's Holiday Home, and in 1957, she began as a caseworker in the Edinburgh-based voluntary organisation, the Guild of Service for Women, working with unmarried mothers and their children and adoptive parents. In 1960, she became a senior caseworker, also establishing placements for students from the new University of Edinburgh child care course.

== Director of Guild of Service ==
From 1962 to 1982, Lusk was Director of the Guild of Service, which began life in 1911 as the Eastern Division of the National Vigilance Association, and later changed its name to Family Care. As Director she pioneered social work practice in adoption, residential child care and single-parent families. She was a leading authority on adoption and served on the Scottish Education Department's Departmental Committee on the Adoption of Children (Known as the Houghton Committee) in 1972. She was also influential in pushing for the professionalisation of social work services in Scotland.

On retiring she was appointed Convener of Scottish Council for Voluntary Organisations, the first woman to hold the position. She continued in the role until 1990.

== Later life ==
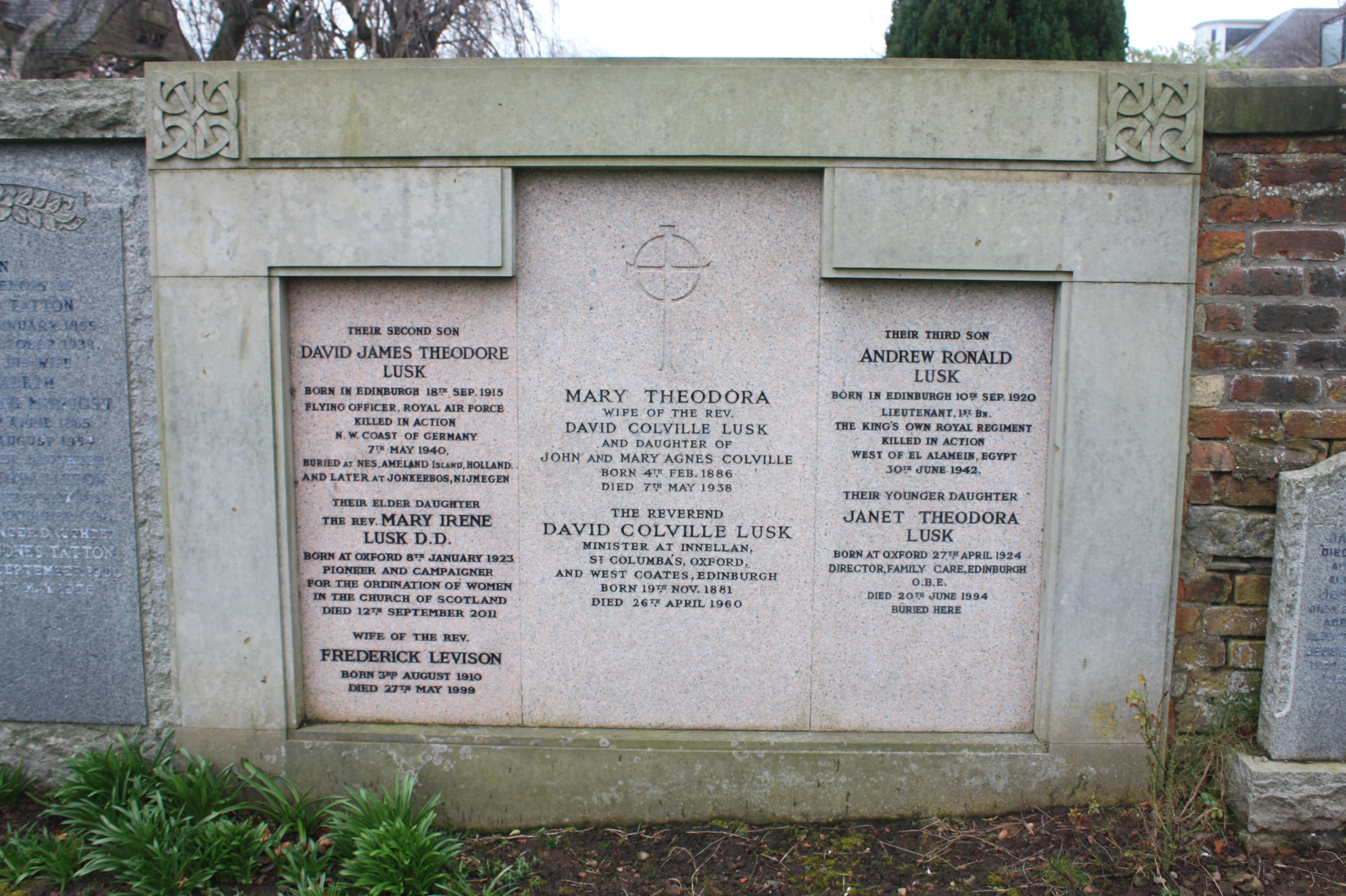
The family grave in Grange Cemetery, Edinburgh where Janet Lusk and her sister Mary Levison are interred.

In the 1970 Birthday Honours, she was appointed an Officer of the Order of the British Empire (OBE) for services to child care.

Lusk died in Edinburgh on 20 June 1994 following a car accident. She left a bequest to St Cuthbert's Church, Edinburgh, where she had been an Elder. Her bequest was used to restore the church's 19th century pipe organ.
