= Vincent C. Plunkett =

American composer (1892–1960)

Vincent Charles Plunkett (August 3, 1892 – November 8, 1960) was an American composer and illustrator of popular songs active in Boston and Los Angeles between 1915 and 1925.

== Biography ==
Vincent C. Plunkett (sometimes "V. C." or just "Vin") was born in Boston to John M. V. and Agnes Plunkett, Massachusetts natives. His father was a letter-carrier; an aunt, Agnes G. Plunkett, was a piano teacher, and another aunt, Katherine Plunkett, was an orchestral musician. Vincent had embarked on a career in music and theatre by 1912, listing himself variously as a "theatrical manager" (1917) and "music salesman" (1920). By 1923 he had moved with his wife and daughter to Santa Monica, California; in 1925 he was in San Francisco; and by 1930 he had returned to Los Angeles, working as a window-dresser and no longer as a musician. By 1942 he was living in Oregon, working as a real estate agent. He died there eighteen years later.

== Composer ==
Vincent Plunkett's first recorded appearance in show business was in March 1912; his act, at the Tremont Theatre, Boston, featured him drawing pictures which he then interpreted in song. There is no indication that his vaudeville career continued; rather, between 1918 and 1920, he published at least eight songs, primarily with the Boston publisher D. W. Cooper and with lyrics by Robert Levenson. His graphic skills remained useful; he also illustrated at least five covers for Cooper and other publishers. After moving to Los Angeles Plunkett published another ten titles, most in collaboration with Earl Comyns and issued by the Angelus Music Company, Los Angeles. Although he listed himself as a "musician" in San Francisco in 1925, his musical career seems to have ended in the late 1920s.
