= My Belgian Rose =

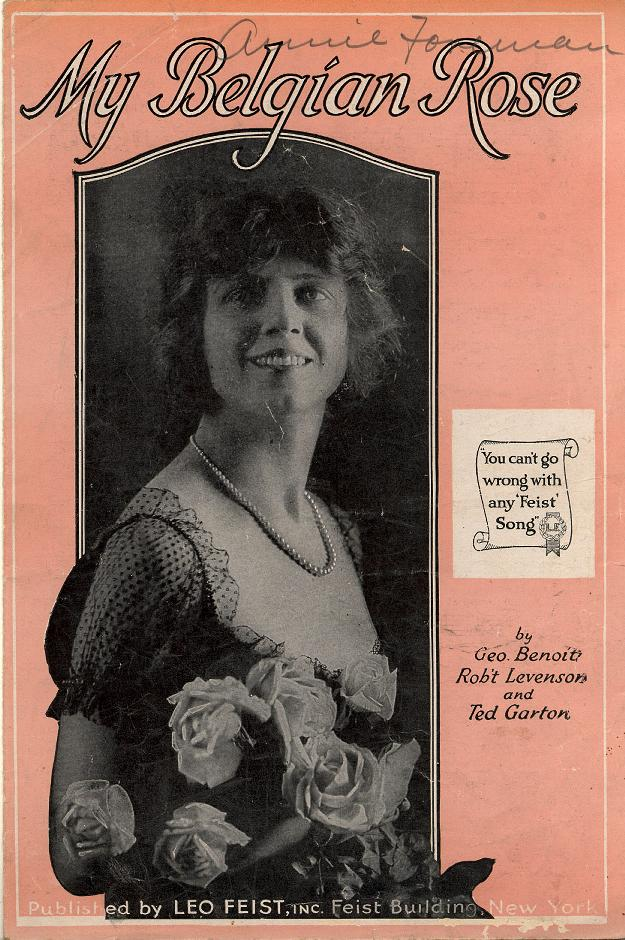
- Sheet music cover

Song
- Published: 1918
- Songwriters: George Benoit, Robert Levenson, Ted Garton

"My Belgian Rose" is a 1918 song written by George Benoit, Robert Levenson, and Ted Garton, and published by Leo Feist, Inc. The song was performed by Charles Hart and Ellot Shaw and reached number eight on the top 100 U.S. songs of 1918.

The song would later be popularized by Yvette of Yvette & Saranoff. Louisa Glaum was featured on one of the sheet music editions as a performer of this song.

== Sheet music ==
The cover illustration for this song features a picture of a woman holding roses, and the back of the cover features an ad for pocket-sized music books from Leo Feist, Inc. A later edition would feature a photo of Yvette.

One edition of "My Belgian Rose" displays a small note identifying it as the "War Edition"‍—‌physically smaller in order to conserve paper during World War I. Compared to its original release in two-page style, the publisher claimed that the War Edition used only half of the amount of paper. It was reprinted four times as a war edition.

== Analysis ==
"My Belgian Rose" depicts the American effort in Europe, particularly focused on the viewpoint of the soldiers. The soldiers describe an appreciation for the beauty that has been destroyed in the war and they express the hope of restoring that beauty once again. Commentary by author Timothy Scheurer remarks that like other songs of the time, "My Belgian Rose" envisions the post-war environment; it uses the rose to represent regeneration in Europe brought about by the promise and efforts of U.S. forces. Early in the piece, the rose is wilting and being crushed by "the tyrant", but later, the lyrics state that the rose will endure and "bloom on a happier day." Scheurer also notes that the concept of restoring "American beauty" abroad is a theme in the 1940 piece, "Johnny Doughboy Found a Rose in Ireland" describing American soldiers stationed in Northern Ireland just prior to World War II.

While many songs from World War I were listed in the Commission on Training Camp Activities song book, which promoted mass singing in order to boost the moral of soldiers and improve fighting capabilities, "My Belgian Rose" was not included. This is thought to be due to its sentimentality which appealed more to the homefront.
