= Lewysohn =

Lewysohn is a surname. Notable people with the surname include:

- Abraham Lewysohn (1805–1860) Hebraist and rabbi
- Ludwig Lewysohn (1819–1901), German rabbi
- Rudolf Lewysohn, birth name of Rudolf Nelson (1878–1960), German composer
