= Street Smart (book) =

Street Smart: Competition, Entrepreneurship, and the Future of Roads is a book about private highways. It covers many aspects of these roads, including the asserted need to protect personal freedom by reducing government control of the roadways; why government highways have failed; how roads can be built without exercising eminent domain authority; how vehicle and driver licensure by insurers can improve road safety; and so on. The writers of the book are Mary E. Peters, Gabriel Roth, John Semmens, Bruce L. Benson, David Levinson, Gopinath Menon, Herbert Mohring, Olegario Villoria, Edward Sullivan, Kenneth Button, Daniel Klein, John Majewski, Fred Foldvary, Christina Malmberg Calvo, Sven Ivarsson, Gunter Zietlow, Jim McLay, Neil Roden, Ian Heggie, Robert W. Poole, Jr., Kenneth Orski, and Peter Samuel.

== See also ==
- Free market road
