= Yael Rom =

Israeli Air Force pilot

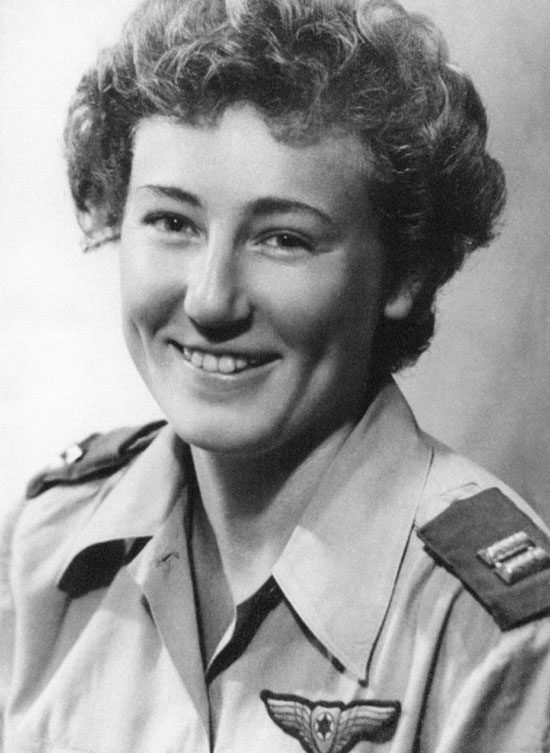
Yael Rom

Yael Rom (Hebrew: יעל רום; 1932–2006), born Yael Finkelstein, was one of the first female pilots of the Israeli Air Force and the first trained and certified by the force. She was co-pilot of the lead C-47 at the parachute drop at the Mitla Pass which launched the 1956 Suez War.

== Biography ==
=== Military career ===
Although often referred to as the IAF's first female pilot, this was not the case. Rom was among the first women trained and certified by the force and the only one to go on to active service.

Born in Tel Aviv in 1932, Rom graduated high school in 1950 and was soon drafted into the Israel Defense Forces Youth Corps. Along with 29 other members of the corps she passed the IAF pilot examinations and along with six other cadets continued on to the basic pilot's course, alongside Rina Levinson and Ruth Bokbinder, finishing second in her class. Initially trained on the Stearman Kaydet, Rom went on to fly twin-engined aircraft and was certified as a flight instructor. Rom received her wings on December 27, 1951, graduating the IAF's 5th flying course. She was then transferred back to the Youth Corps to instruct future cadets. For six months she petitioned the IDF to return to the air force, meeting with considerable resistance, before her request was finally granted. In 1953 Rom joined the ranks of the 103rd "Flying Elephants" Squadron, flying the Douglas C-47 Skytrain.

After her discharge from the IDF, Rom continued to fly as a reserve pilot. She was called up in October 1956 to participate in Operation Machbesh (Press), the Israeli parachute drop that launched the Suez War. Rom was the co-pilot of the lead C-47 in the 16-ship formation which dropped Israeli paratroops at the Mitla Pass. She spent the rest of the war shuttling supplies to the troops in the Sinai and evacuating the wounded. Rom was on board the first aircraft to land at Sharm el-Sheik after its capture by Israeli forces, and dropped paratroops at El-Tor on November 3.

Rom retired from reserve service in 1962 after the birth of her first daughter, although she had initially failed to report the birth in order to evade the IDF policy of discharging mothers.

=== Civilian career ===
Rom graduated from the Hebrew University in Jerusalem with a degree in history and political science, as well as a teacher's certificate. In 1957 she was invited to join Arkia Airlines, working as a first officer for three years. Between 1960 and 1982 she worked for the Technion Institute of Technology in educational research, consultation and administration. She initiated and developed a unit providing academic support for under-represented groups such as minorities and the handicapped. Later in life she initiated and developed ORT's "Young Women in the 21st Century" program which encourages young women to pursue careers in engineering.

In 1974 Rom established the Women's Council of the Haifa mayor's office. Although a longtime member of the Likud, in 1983 she ran for the post of mayor of Haifa at the head of an independent list, coming in second with 17.9 percent of the vote.

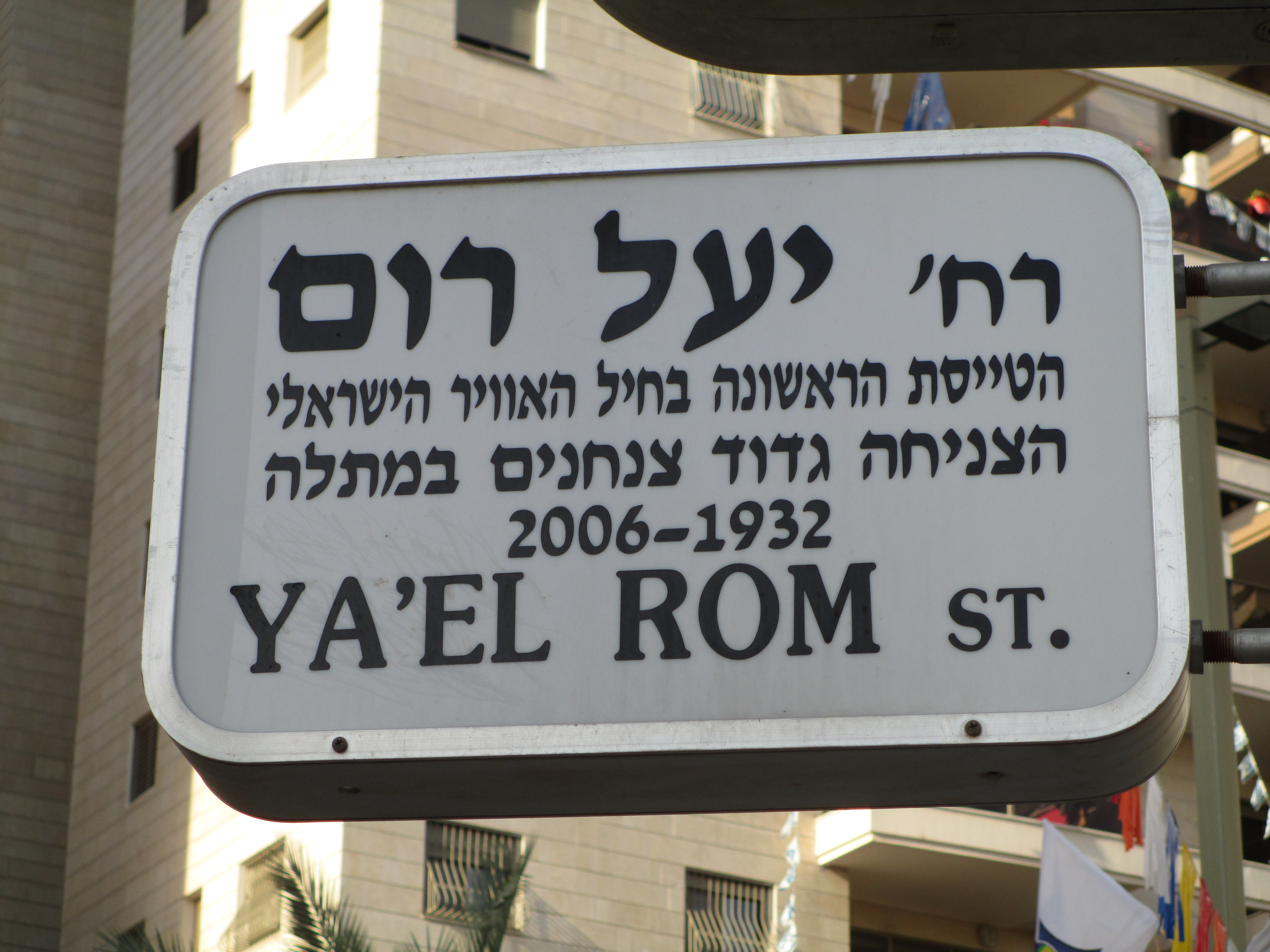

Rom, a mother of three, was married to Yosef Rom, a professor of aeronautics at the Technion and a former Likud member of the Knesset. She died in Haifa on May 24, 2006. On May 26, 2008, the city of Petah Tikva named a local street in her honor, in a ceremony attended by family and members of 103 Squadron.

== See also ==
- Roni Zuckerman
