= Horace Clifford Levinson =

American mathematician and astronomer

Horace Clifford Levinson (30 June 1895, in Chicago – 1968, in Kennebunk, Maine) was an American mathematician, astronomer, and pioneer of operations research, introducing quantitative methods and sophisticated mathematical models into advertising and merchandising.

Horace C. Levinson's father was the noted Chicago lawyer Salmon Oliver Levinson. In 1909 the Society of Practical Astronomical was founded by two teenagers: Frederick Charles Leonard (1896–1960) as president and H. C. Levinson as treasurer. The Society was disbanded in 1917, but it played a significant role in the history of the American Association of Variable Star Observers. During World War I, Levinson was a lieutenant in the U.S. Army.

In September 1922, Levinson received his Ph.D. in mathematical astronomy and pure mathematics from the University of Chicago with thesis The gravitational field of masses relatively at rest according to Einstein's theory of gravitation. In 1924 he was an Invited Speaker of the ICM in Toronto.

During the 1930s, Horace C. Levinson began to apply scientific analysis for the problems of merchandising. His work for L. Bamberger and Company, involved, among other things, a study of customer buying habits, the response to advertising, and the relation of environment to the type of articles sold. In the 1920s, Levinson had completed a study for a mail-order house on the effect of speeded-up shipment on the customer acceptance or rejection of c.o.d. packages. His success in predicting general human reactions from the collection and analysis of great quantities of data led him later to initiate a study for Bamberger on the effectiveness, in terms of added sales, of keeping department stores open at night.

Levinson taught mathematics at Ohio State University and was the chair of the Committee on Operations Research of the U.S. National Research Council.

== Selected publications ==
- with E. B. Zeisler: The Law of Gravitation in Relativity. University of Chicago Press. 1931.
- Levinson, Horace C. (1934). "Notes on stellar photography". Popular Astronomy. 42: 121–131. Bibcode:1934PA.....42..121L.
- Levinson, Horace C. (1953). "Experiences in commercial operations research". Journal of the Operations Research Society of America. 1 (4): 220–239. doi:10.1287/opre.1.4.220.
- Chance, luck, and statistics. Dover Publications. 2001. ISBN 9780486419978. reprint of Science of chance: from probability to statistics. New York: Rinehart. 1950. first printed as Your chance to win: the laws of chance and probability. 1939.
