= Richard Kastle =

American classical pianist and composer (born 1958)

- Born: December 15, 1958 (age 67); Palm Beach, Florida
- Occupations: Pianist and composer

Richard Kastle (born December 15, 1958) is an American classical pianist and composer.

== Life and career ==
Kastle was born in Palm Beach, Florida, and began playing piano at age eight in 1966, learning to play by ear. "He's a musical genius." said his former piano teacher. "I remember he walked In and played the Hungarian Rhapsody No. 2 by Franz Liszt after hearing it on the Tom and Jerry cartoon," she said. "Back then, he couldn't even read music." Kastle studied with Ivan Davis. He began composing piano concertos as a teenager while studying with Davis. He continued his studies as a piano major at the University of North Texas, where he was expelled for calling in sick on his final recital. An official at the music department recalled Kastle, but said that neither he nor anyone else could remember enough about the case to comment. Kastle said that it was his refusal to dress formally for concerts that ultimately got him expelled from the music department. He later made monthly performances at clubs in Venice and Santa Monica, California where he built a following of young, often college-age, listeners.

== Performance and recording career ==
Kastle made his network television debut in 1989 on CBS's The Pat Sajak Show, after an appearance on Canadian teen show Pilot One. He signed with Virgin Records in 1991 and released the album Streetwise in the same year. Kastle's television appearances include a performance and interview on The Joan Rivers Show and NBC's The Tonight Show with Jay Leno. Kastle promoted his national tour on the episode that aired July 3, 1991. The tour included solo concerts and appearances with comedians George Carlin and Jay Leno. In 1992, he recorded his Piano Concerto No. 5, also known as the Royce Concerto, with the Philharmonia Orchestra in London. He appeared at Lincoln Center on November 8, 1996, performing his own compositions and works by Chopin and Liszt. Titanic Symphony is his third symphony and is based on the sinking of the RMS Titanic. He conducted the premieres of his Titanic Symphony and Symphony No. 5 at Lincoln Center on November 6, 1999. Kastle has composed eight piano concertos. In 2003, he played arrangements of Beethoven's sonatas for piano and orchestra and premiered his Piano Concerto No. 8. He performs piano recitals on college campuses.

== Awards ==
In 1976, the mayor of Hialeah proclaimed March 30 in honor of Kastle. At the time, he was a student at Hialeah Miami-Lakes High School who had just competed successfully for a music scholarship.

== Albums ==
- Streetwise
- Royce Concerto
