= Yosef Rom =

Israeli engineer and politician

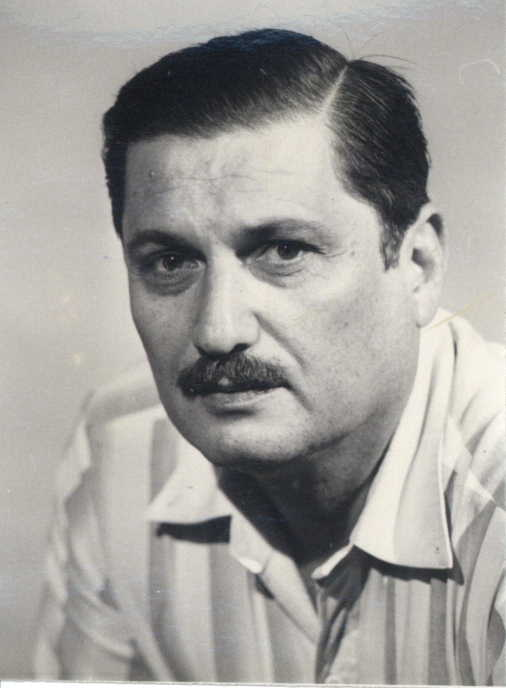
- Rom during his time in the Knesset

Faction represented in the Knesset
- 1977–1984: Likud

Personal details
- Born: 2 September 1932 Warsaw, Poland
- Died: 19 November 1997 (aged 65)

Yosef Rom (Hebrew: יוסף רום; 2 September 1932 – 19 November 1997) was an Israeli engineer and politician who served as a member of the Knesset for Likud between 1977 and 1984.

== Biography ==
Born Yosef Rabinovich in Warsaw in Poland in 1932, Rom emigrated to Mandatory Palestine in 1935. He attended high school in Tel Aviv, before studying mechanical and aeronautical engineering at the Illinois Institute of Technology and the California Institute of Technology. He worked as a research associate at Caltech between 1957 and 1958, before returning to Israel to become a lecturer at the Technion. From 1964 until 1965, and again from 1968 until 1970 and in 1976, he served as Dean of the Aeronautical Engineering Faculty, and in 1976 won the Israel Prize, for technology and engineering.

In the same year he joined Herut, and chaired its Haifa branch between 1976 and 1977. He also chaired the party's Young Guard movement from 1977 until 1981. He was elected to the Knesset on the Likud list (an alliance of Herut and other right-of-centre parties) in the 1977 elections, and was re-elected in 1981. However, he lost his seat in the 1984 elections.

Rom was married to Yael Rom, one of the first female pilots of the Israeli Air Force. He died in 1997 at the age of 65.

== See also ==
- List of Israel Prize recipients
