= Lewisohn =

Lewisohn is a surname. Notable people with the surname include:

- Adolph Lewisohn (1849–1938), German-American merchant and philanthropist
- Alice Lewisohn (1883–1972), American co-founder of Neighborhood Playhouse and actress, daughter of Leonard
- Irene Lewisohn (1892–1944), American co-founder of Neighborhood Playhouse and the Museum of Costume Art, daughter of Leonard
- Jesse Lewisohn (1872–1918), American businessman and racehorse owner, son of Leonard
- Leonard Lewisohn (philanthropist) (1847–1902), German-American merchant and philanthropist, brother of Adolph
- Leonard Lewisohn (Islamic studies scholar) (1953–2018), American author, translator, and lecturer
- Ludwig Lewisohn (1882–1955), German-American writer
- Mark Lewisohn (born 1958), British author and historian
- Richard Lewisohn (1875–1961), German-American surgeon
- Sam A. Lewisohn (1884–1951), American lawyer, financier, philanthropist, art collector, and non-fiction author

== See also ==
- Lewisohn Stadium, NYC
- Lewysohn
- Levison
- Lewisson
