= David Levinson =

David Levinson may refer to:

- David A. Levinson, American soap opera writer
- David M. Levinson (born 1967), American civil engineer and transportation analyst
- David N. Levinson (?–2019), American politician and former Insurance Commissioner of Delaware
- David S. Levinson (born 1969), American short story writer and novelist
- David Levinson (producer) (1939–2019), American television producer and writer
- David Levinson, protagonist of the Independence Day franchise, portrayed by Jeff Goldblum
