= Arthur Levenson =

American cryptographer (1914–2007)

Arthur J. Levenson
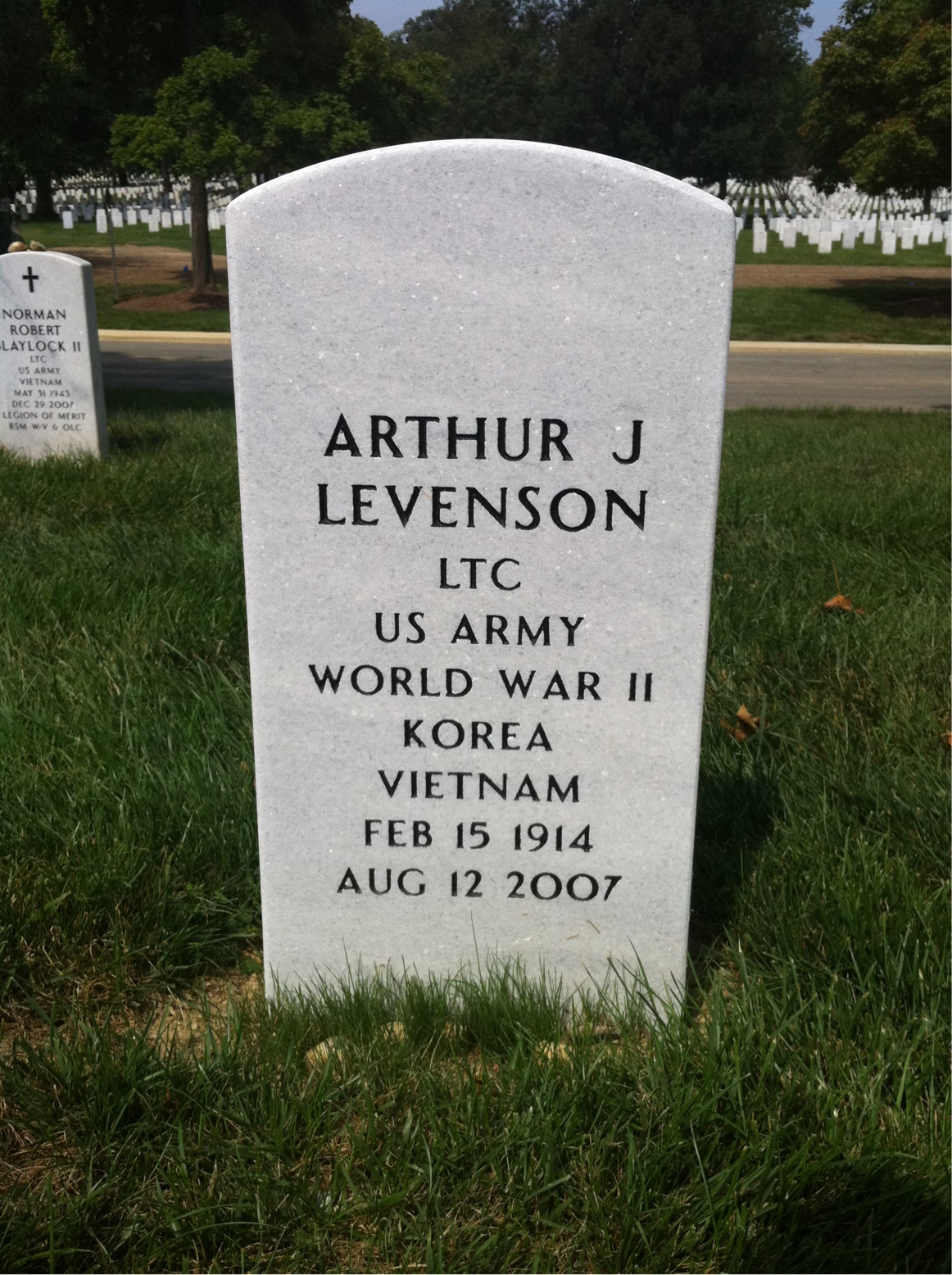
- Grave at Arlington National Cemetery
- Born: February 15, 1914; Brooklyn, New York
- Died: August 12, 2007 (aged 93)
- Resting place: Arlington National Cemetery
- Citizenship: American
- Education: City College of New York
- Scientific career
- Fields: Cryptanalysis, Public key cryptography
- Workplaces: United States Army; National Security Agency

Arthur J. Levenson (February 15, 1914 – August 12, 2007) was a cryptographer, United States Army officer and NSA official who worked on the Japanese J19 and the German Enigma codes.

== Biography ==
Arthur J. Levenson was born in Brooklyn, New York. He earned a B.S. in Mathematics from the City College of New York. He did graduate work in mathematics at New York University and Columbia University. He attained the rank of lieutenant colonel in the U.S. Army. Levenson was a graduate of the National War College. Levenson and his wife Marjorie West (1917–2011) are buried at Arlington National Cemetery.

=== World War II Service ===
At the beginning of World War II, the Army called Mr. Levenson to active duty from the Enlisted Reserve Corps. He was approved for Signal Corps Officer Candidate School at Fort Monmouth Levenson was selected by Major William P. Bundy to be a member of the 6811th Signal Company. The 6811th Signal joined the British wartime code breaking organization at Bletchley Park in Britain. At Bletchley Park, Levenson worked against both the ENIGMA and TUNNY German cipher machines in the famous Hut 6. Levenson developed a friendship with British cryptanalysts Alan Turing and Hugh Alexander. After V-E Day, Levenson was sent with a group of British and American officers to Germany, assigned to track down German cipher equipment and to locate and interrogate German cryptanalysts. In his obituary in The Washington Post, an anecdote from his wartime service showed his operational contribution:

In a 1999 PBS documentary about the decoding project, Mr. Levenson said the team at Bletchley sometimes deciphered the German messages before German forces in the field could read them. "If it was something hot," he said, "it'd get out in the field before the German commander got his." In one case, Mr. Levenson said, the team decoded a message from German military leader Erwin Rommel and determined that German tanks were converging at a spot in Normandy where U.S. paratroopers were planning to jump. "They were going to drop one of the airborne divisions right on top of a German tank division," Mr. Levenson said in the documentary. "They would have been massacred." At the last moment, plans were changed, and the paratroopers averted disaster.

=== National Security Agency ===
After completing his service overseas, he remained in the cryptologic business as a civilian with the organizations that eventually evolved into the National Security Agency. He was a member and subsequently Chief of the Technical Consultants Group, the prestigious cryptanalytic organization where the most difficult problems were attacked. During that period he initiated the program for sending out selected NSA working mathematicians to participate in the recruitment of promising college math students-a program that greatly enhanced the quality of the growing NSA professional work force.

When the Office of Production in NSA was re-structured to better focus its attacks he was selected to organize and serve as the first Chief of ADVA, an organization dedicated to the exploitation of Soviet high-grade encryption systems. He led the design and implementation of the technical attack team. He took the lead in procuring high-level government support for the project from experts like William O. Baker, head of the Bell Laboratories and longtime member of the President's Foreign Intelligence Advisory Board. Levenson became chief of A Group, the major NSA organization devoted to analyzing Soviet Bloc communications. Under his leadership, A group was refocused to enhance the timeliness of its Signals Intelligence reporting to the intelligence community. Before he retired in December 1973, Levenson served as Chief of the Machine Processing Organization, responsible for the maintenance and operation of the large NSA facility which housed both commercial off- the-shelf computers and highly sophisticated special purpose machines. Levenson introduced computer management structure professionals from private industry opening up the organization to innovation from outside of the elite cryptologic workforce. Levenson retired with 32 years of Agency service.

=== Data Encryption Standard ===
In 1976, after retiring from NSA, Levenson and NSA and NBS representatives met with the Stanford University cryptography team which had publicly criticized NSA's proposed Data Encryption Standard, DES, as being too easy to crack. In this meeting with Whitfield Diffie, Martin Hellman, and Paul Baran, he tried to convince the critics that "56 [bits] is quite adequate", because (among other reasons) brute force attack would never be the weakest link in the security of systems that used DES. NSA succeeded in getting broad adoption of 56-bit DES, particularly in the financial industry. This allowed NSA and other countries to decipher most of the world's financial transactions, until the EFF DES cracker convinced banks to switch to stronger ciphers in 1998.

== Family ==
He was married for 62 years to Marjorie West Levenson of Washington. He had three children, David West Levenson of Warren, N.J., Sarah Stromeyer of Austin and Rebecca Levenson Smith of Silver Spring; and two grandchildren.

== Awards ==
Levenson was awarded the NSA Exceptional Civilian Service Award in 1969. and was inducted to the NSA Hall of Honor in 2009.
