= Sara Levinson =

American entrepreneur

- Born: August 23, 1950 (age 76); Portsmouth, Virginia, United States
- Education: Cornell University; Columbia Business School
- Occupations: Business executive Entrepreneur
- Years active: 1976-present
- Known for: President, NFL Properties (1994-2000); Co-President, MTV (1991-1994)
- Spouse: Charles Hairston
- Children: Avery Hairston; Jason Hairston (stepson)

Sara Levinson (born August 23, 1950) is a former executive and American entrepreneur in the fields of entertainment, media, sports and technology. She was responsible for MTV's global expansion and orchestrated the NFL's outreach to women and kids. She is co-founder of the tech startup Katapult and serves on the board of Harley Davidson and Macy's.

== Early life ==
Levinson was raised in Portsmouth, Virginia, where she graduated from Woodrow Wilson High School. She is the fourth of five children, born to Seymour "Sy" Levinson, a chemist, and Esther Levinson, a high-school history teacher.

In 1972, Levinson earned a Bachelor of Science from the College of Human Ecology at Cornell University. In 1976, she received a Master of Business Administration from Columbia Business School.

== Career ==
After graduating Columbia, Levinson worked as an Account Executive at Doyle Dane Bernbach (DDB), an advertising firm in New York City, from 1976 to 1978.

=== Viacom (1978-1994) ===
Levinson worked for 16 years at Viacom across multiple divisions including Showtime, Viacom Cable, Viacom Corporate, and MTV Networks.

==== Showtime Entertainment (1978-1980, 1984-1986) ====
Levinson initially joined Viacom in 1978 under its subsidiary, Showtime, a then two-year-old premium television network. She first served as Showtime's Advertising and Promotion Manager before becoming Director of Marketing.

Levinson transitioned to Viacom Cable in 1980 and returned to Showtime four years later for a second stint as EVP of Business and Strategic Planning.

==== Viacom Cable (1980-1982) ====
In 1980, Levinson was recruited internally away from Showtime to become Director Marketing Corporate for Viacom Cable. In 1982, she briefly left Viacom to serve as VP of Marketing at GW Satellite Communications, a newly-formed cable network group, responsible for the marketing and distribution of various cable networks.

==== Viacom Corporate (1983-1984) ====
In 1983, Levinson was hired back to Viacom the following year as Director of Corporate Development where she pursued Viacom's expansion through acquisition of several television, radio, and cable properties, including MTV Networks.

==== MTV Networks (1986-1994) ====
In 1986, Levinson was hired as EVP of New Business Development for MTV Networks, where she orchestrated the strategy to further expand MTV Networks.

In 1990, Levinson moved into a role as EVP MTV Business Director. She most notably oversaw MTV's global expansion, bringing the network to almost every continent and into publishing, merchandising, and licensing. She launched MTV in Asia, Japan, Brazil, Latin America, and Australia. She is credited with hastening the network's global development by pursuing agreements for a host of products and ancillary businesses, such as an MTV record club, a Nickelodeon production studio, and MTV's Spanish language program, MTV Internacional. During this time, she was named to Crain's New York Business 40 Under 40.

In 1993, Levinson was named Co-President of MTV. Under her management, MTV reached 239 million households in 63 countries, including 59 million in the United States.

During her tenure, she served on the board of MTV Europe and Comedy Central's predecessor, The Comedy Channel.

=== NFL (1994-2000) ===
In 1994, Levinson left Viacom to run the NFL's marketing, licensing, and sponsorship arm, representing the league and all 32 teams. As President of NFL Properties, she became the first female president and highest ranking woman in major league sports.

Commissioner Paul Tagliabue tasked Levinson with making football more youthful and "iconoclastic". To this end, she is credited with expanding the league's marketing message, targeting women and children for the first time in League history.

Levinson built the NFL's first marketing research departments and introduced development programs to expand the league's viewership among casual fans. In 1999, Levinson made the NFL an official national sponsor of the Susan B. Komen Breast Cancer Foundation, to further the league's appeal with its 68 million female viewers. Under Levinson's direction, the NFL started a network of flag-football leagues called Play Football and a girls-only division of Punt, Pass and Kick. As a result of her promotional efforts to women and kids, Advertising Age named the NFL the Promotional Marketer of the year.

During Levinson's tenure at the NFL, she led NFL properties to sign Nike to a five-year licensing deal valued at an estimated $200 million and secured other name-brand sponsors such as Visa and Motorola, pushing the division to over $3 billion in retail sales.

As a result of her work in the league, Levinson was awarded the Advertising Age 1995 Promotional Marketer of the Year, Women In Sports and Entertainment (WISE) Woman of the Year Award 1995, and The Sporting News' 100 Most Powerful People in Sports from 1996-98.

=== Club Mom (Cafe Media) (2000-2002) ===
After 7 years, Levinson left the NFL to become CEO and Chairman of ClubMom (later named Café Media), a dot-com era e-commerce/marketing company for moms.

Levinson stepped down in 2002, but remained on the board of directors until the company was sold to Zelnick Media in 2018.

=== Rodale (2002-2005) ===
As President of the Women's Publishing Group at Rodale, Levinson oversaw some of the world's largest publishing brands in the health and wellness field, including Prevention Magazine, Organic Gardening, and South Beach Diet.

== Board memberships ==
- 1996–Present - Harley-Davidson (first female board member)
- 1997–Present - Macy's
- 2013–Present - Katapult, Co-Founder
- 2000-2018 - Cafe Media (previously Club Mom)
