= Jill Levenson =

American academic and social worker

Jill S. Levenson is an American social worker and professor of social work at Barry University, known for her research into prevention of sexual violence. She studies and treats both victimization and perpetration as well as policies related to management of people convicted of sexual crimes. She has been a co-investigator or consultant on five grants funded by the U.S. Department of Justice, researching the impact and effectiveness of social policies and therapeutic interventions designed to reduce sexual violence.

Levenson's research focuses on the relationship between adverse childhood experiences and adult psychosocial problems and criminality. She has published over 120 peer-reviewed articles and book chapters and has been invited to present at conferences across the world about trauma-informed care in clinical, correctional, and forensic settings.

== Education and career ==
Levenson received her BA in sociology from the University of Pittsburgh in 1985, her MSW in clinical social work from the University of Maryland, Baltimore in 1987, and her PhD in social welfare from Florida International University in 2003. In 2004, she joined the faculty of Lynn University's College of Arts and Sciences, where she remained until joining Barry in 2014.

== Views ==
Levenson has criticized sex offender registries for what she claims is their ineffectiveness, telling NPR in 2015 that "The consensus of that [policy] research does not point in the direction of registries reducing sexual crimes or sexual recidivism." She has expressed similar views about laws restricting where sex offenders can legally live, acknowledging that these laws are well-intended but saying that "they don't really address the most common types of situations children are abused in," because "Children are much more likely to be sexually abused by someone they know and trust." She has also been critical of the use of GPSs to monitor sex offenders, because, according to her, the technology is used too sweepingly and its capabilities are overestimated. She advocates for evidence-based policies and interventions that prevent sexual violence and recidivism, and that also promote successful re-entry, reintegration, and rehabilitation.

She is also an expert in trauma therapy for survivors, trauma-informed care, perpetration prevention, and restorative justice approaches to address sexual harm.
