= Richard Leveson =

Richard Leveson may refer to:

- Sir Richard Leveson (1598–1661), English politician, MP for Newcastle-under-Lyme, and for Shropshire
- Sir Richard Leveson (admiral) (c. 1570–1605), vice-admiral of England and MP for Shropshire
- Richard Leveson (died 1699) (1659–1699), major-general and MP for Lichfield and Newport (Isle of Wight)

== See also ==
- Richard Leveson-Gower (1726–1753), MP for Lichfield
