= Noah Levenson =

Noah Levenson (born 1981) is an American computer programmer and the creator of Stealing Ur Feelings, an interactive project that won Mozilla's $50,000 prize for art and advocacy exploring artificial intelligence. Stealing Ur Feelings won the 2020 Webby Award in the category of Immersive And Mixed Reality.

== Career ==
In 2017, Levenson created Weird Box, an interactive project about social media privacy that was featured in Fast Company and SFist.

In 2018, he created Stealing Ur Feelings, a web-based augmented reality experience that was awarded Mozilla's $50,000 prize for art and advocacy exploring artificial intelligence. The project explores the dangers of facial emotion recognition AI in consumer applications. It was executive produced by Brett Gaylor, director of Do Not Track.

Stealing Ur Feelings premiered at the 2019 Tribeca Film Festival and was an official selection of the Camden International Film Festival and Montreal International Documentary Festival.

Levenson's work has been the subject of articles in Scientific American, Engadget, and El Pais. He has been interviewed about artificial intelligence and corporate practices for Report on Rai3 and CBC Radio One.

He has written about the internet and meme culture for the NY Daily News.
