= Street Wisdom =

UK nonprofit institution founded in 2014

Street Wisdom is an international nonprofit institution founded in 2014 by David Pearl and Chris Baréz-Brown. It gives free education that teaches individuals and organizations how to use urban environments. These use a mix of cognitive science, mindfulness, and psychology techniques. The concept has been used by major corporations like Google, Samsung, Barclays, and Lush. The UK based organization operates across Europe and the Americas. In 2017, Street Wisdom and Psychologies magazine hosted the first World Wide Wander, which included 36 events over 3 days in 12 countries.
