= Leveson =

Leveson is a surname. The name as printed can represent two quite different etymologies and pronunciations:

1. A Leveson family who were Merchants of the Staple became very influential in Wolverhampton in the late Middle Ages, supplying both lay support and clergy to St Peter's Collegiate Church. They were the ancestors of a number of important landed gentry and peers, in various branches, including the Leveson-Gowers. Their name could be rendered in numerous ways in the early modern period: Levison, Leweson, and Luson are all common. To modern readers, the latter represents the pronunciation most accurately. An example of its use is a letter to Robert Cecil, dated 5 August 1602, which reports that "eight of the galleys which fought with Sir Richard Luson were repaired." Leveson is an example of an English surname with counterintuitive pronunciation. The generally accepted pronunciation is /ˈljuːsən/ LEW-sən. It is a patronymic from Louis or Lewis.
2. Leveson can also be a patronymic from the Hebrew name Levi, and so is most found among Ashkenazi families. This is generally pronounced as /ˈlɛvɪsən/ LEV-iss-ən.

== Notable people called Leveson ==
=== Surname ===
- Arthur Leveson GCB (1868–1929), senior officer in the Royal Navy
- Brian Leveson QC, (born 1949), English judge in the Court of Appeal and head of the Sentencing Council for England and Wales
- Henry Astbury Leveson "The Old Shekarry" (1828–1875), big game hunter
- Jack Leveson (1882–1949), Australian rugby league footballer
- Jane Leveson (born 1954), British courtier
- John Leveson (1555–1615), English politician
- John Leveson (died 1613), son and heir of Sir John Leveson; died of the plague
- Matthew Leveson (1986–2007), Australian murder victim
- Nancy Leveson, leading American expert in system and software safety
- Richard Leveson (disambiguation), multiple people
- Walter Leveson (1550–1602), English politician and landowner
- William Leveson (died 1621), English mercer

=== Given name ===
- Leveson Randolph (1824–1876), English cricketer and clergyman
- Leveson Somerset (1829–1900), British Royal Navy officer

== See also ==
- Leveson Inquiry into the British press following the News International phone hacking scandal
- Leveson-Gower
- Levison
