= Eugene Levinson =

Eugene Levinson is the former principal double bassist of the New York Philharmonic and teaches at the Juilliard School.

== Career ==
According to the New Method for Double Bass (Carl Fischer edition), Levinson, who was born in Kiev, began to study music at the age of nine. He graduated from the Leningrad Conservatory, later receiving a doctoral degree from this institution. At the age of twenty-nine, he was the youngest member ever to be appointed to the Leningrad Conservatory's faculty. In Leningrad, he also became a member of the Leningrad Philharmonic Orchestra, where he played for almost sixteen years, and was Principal Bass of the Leningrad Chamber Orchestra for thirteen years.

Levinson traveled to the United States in 1977, and began a short tenure as principal Bass of the Minnesota Orchestra soon after his arrival. While living in the States, he served on the faculty of both the Sarasota Music Festival and the Aspen Music Festival, as well as the Indiana University Summer School. He joined the bass faculty of Juilliard in 1985, and was appointed Principal Bass of the New York Philharmonic in May of that year.

In 2003, Levinson was given the Special Recognition Award in Orchestral Performance from the International Society of Bassists for his "extraordinary skills and contribution to the worldwide community of bassists".

== Discography ==
=== Studio albums ===
1968 — «1» (LP 10") Melodiya
No.	Title	Length
1.	"Paul Hindemith - Sonata for Double Bass and Piano: Allegretto"
2.	"Paul Hindemith - Sonata for Double Bass and Piano: Scherzo. Allegro assai"
3.	"Paul Hindemith - Sonata for Double Bass and Piano: Molto Adagio, Recitativo, lied (Allegretto grazioso)"
4.	"Gabriel Fauré - The Élégie (Elegy), Op. 24"
5.	"Enrique Granados - Intermezzo from Goyescas"
6.	"Enrique Granados - Spanish Dance Op.37, No.5"

1973 — «2» (LP 12") Melodiya
No.	Title	Length
1.	"Johann Christian Bach - ADAGIO from the Concerto for viola and string orchestra"
2.	"Serge Koussevitzky - Concerto for Double-Bass and Piano in F-sharp Minor: Allegro"
3.	"Serge Koussevitzky - Concerto for Double-Bass and Piano in F-sharp Minor: Andante"
4.	"Serge Koussevitzky - Concerto for Double-Bass and Piano in F-sharp Minor: Allegro"
5.	"Adolf Mišek - Educational Sonata for double-bass and piano in E Minor, Op.6: Con Fuoco. Tempo giusto. Tempo animoso"
6.	"Adolf Mišek - Educational Sonata for double-bass and piano in E Minor, Op.6: Andante Cantabile. Animato"
7.	"Adolf Mišek - Educational Sonata for double-bass and piano in E Minor, Op.6: Furiant. Allegro energico"
8.	"Adolf Mišek - Educational Sonata for double-bass and piano in E Minor, Op.6: Finale. Allegro Appassionato"

1984 — «3» (LP 12" & Cassette) Pro Arte
No.	Title	Length
1.	"César Franck - Sonata in A major for Violin and Piano: Allegretto ben moderato"
2.	"César Franck - Sonata in A major for Violin and Piano: Allegro"
3.	"César Franck - Sonata in A major for Violin and Piano: Ben moderato (Recitativo-Fantasia)"
4.	"César Franck - Sonata in A major for Violin and Piano: Allegretto poco mosso"
5.	"Dmitri Shostakovich - Adagio"
6.	"Sergei Rachmaninoff - Melodie Op.3 No.3"
7.	"Sergei Rachmaninoff - Oriental Dance Op.2"
8.	"Pyotr Tchaikovsky - Nocturne"

1996 — «4» (CD) Cala Artists
No.	Title	Length
1.	"Behzad Ranjbaran - Dance Of Life for Violin and Double Bass: Andante con espressione"
2.	"Behzad Ranjbaran - Dance Of Life for Violin and Double Bass: Allegretto"
3.	"Ludwig van Beethoven - Sonata in A Major Op.17: Allegro moderato"
4.	"Ludwig van Beethoven - Sonata in A Major Op.17: Poco Adagio, quasi Andante"
5.	"Ludwig van Beethoven - Sonata in A Major Op.17: Rondo. Allegro moderato"
6.	"Max Bruch - Kol Nidrei Op. 47, No.5"
7.	"Paul Hindemith - Sonata: Allegretto"
8.	"Paul Hindemith - Sonata: Scherzo-Allegro assai"
9.	"Paul Hindemith - Sonata: Molto Adagio"
10.	"Serge Koussevitzky - Valse Miniature Op. 1, No.2"
11.	"Pyotr Tchaikovsky - Meditation Op. 72"
12.	"Sergei Rachmaninoff - Elegiac Trio for Piano, Violin and Double Bass"

== The School of Agility ==
The School of Agility is a book by Eugene Levinson (also published by Carl Fischer) which concentrates on improving vital fingering technique for bass players of all levels. His approach focuses on improving rhythm, intonation and fingerboard agility via a variety of fingerings.

The book includes: -Fingerings designed to allow the individual bassist to find those most suitable to their style and level of playing. -Fingerings appropriate to certain playing situations -Fingerings concerned with the shaping of phrases by facilitating smoother transitions. -Techniques to help produce a clean and clear sound.
