= Robert Levenson =

American lyricist

Robert Levenson (July 19, 1897 – April 26, 1961) was an American lyricist active in Boston in the late 1910s.

== Biography ==
Robert Levenson was born in Boston to Samuel and Paulina Levenson, immigrants from Russia and Austria respectively. Samuel was a tailor and shoemaker, and his son eventually took up a career in the clothing business. After attending Boston Latin School, Robert went to Harvard, graduating in 1917. He subsequently moved to New York City, married Evelyn Lippmann, from Edgemere (Queens), and worked his way up in the business world; at his death he was a partner in the Purl Knit Sales Company. He was very active in his local community, Lawrence, Long Island, and in many Jewish societies; a remarkably large number of tributes appeared in The New York Times in the days following his death in Lawrence.

== Lyricist work ==
Between 1914 and 1925 Levenson wrote lyrics for at least thirty-five songs, on a few of which he was also credited with composing the music, usually in collaboration. Early collaborations, with Vincent Plunkett, were issued by D. W. Cooper. A third of his copyright registrations occurred in 1919, and very few appear after 1920. He was an amateur performer as well, usually in events organised by Jewish societies. His noteworthy contributions include lyrics for E. E. Bagley’s celebrated march, “National emblem” (1918), "The Angel God Sent from Heaven," three flower-bedecked World War I songs, "My Belgian Rose," "Salvation Rose," and “When the Lilies Bloom in France Again”; and a briefly but vigorously promoted “sob” ballad, “Little by little you’re breaking my heart.” All but a few titles were issued by Boston publishers, though "My Belgian Rose" was taken up by Leo Feist.
