= Rina Levinson =

Israeli aviator (1927–2021)

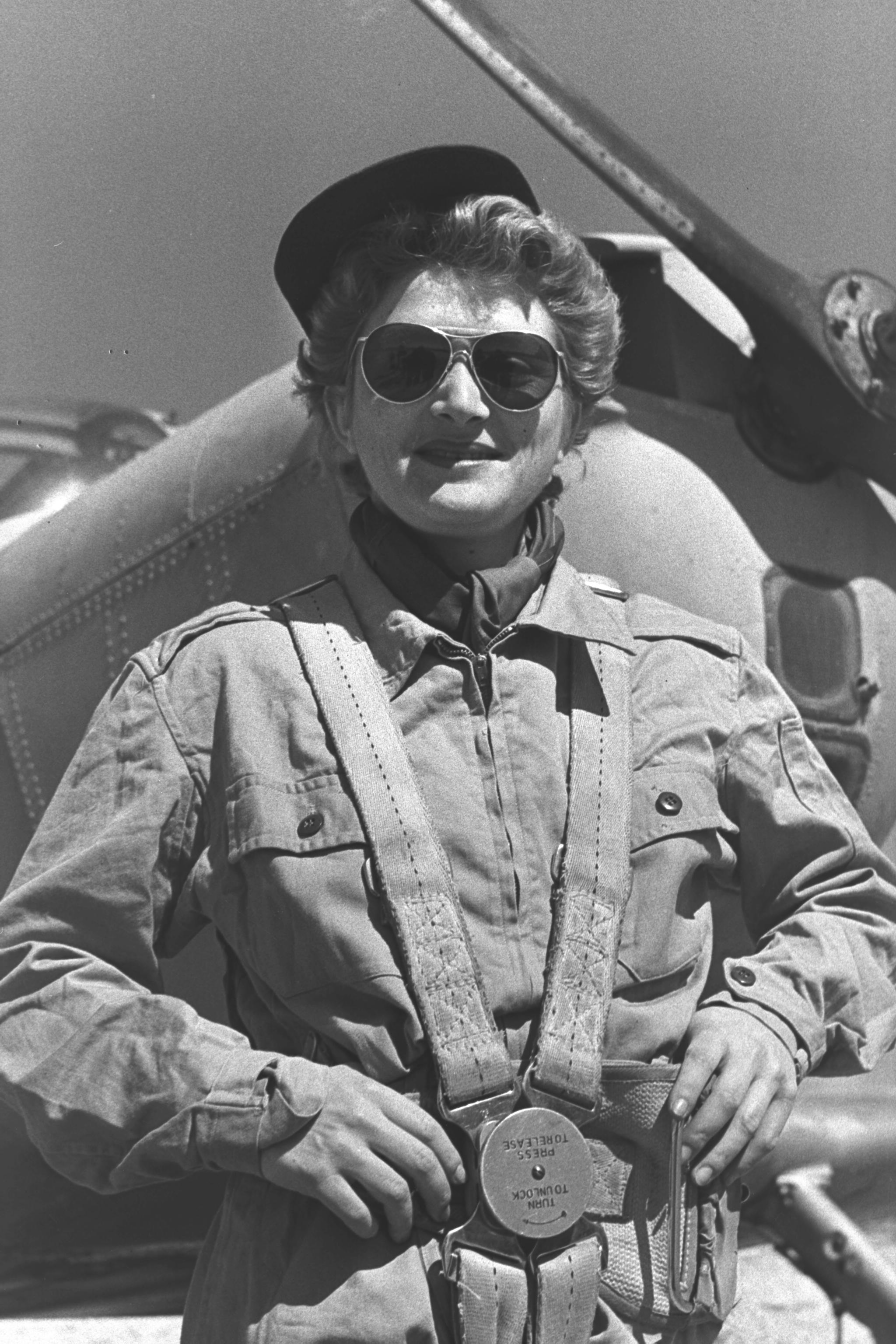
Rina Levinson (1955)

Rina Levinson-Adler (Hebrew: רינה לוינסון-אדלר; 27 April 1927 – 11 April 2021) was one of the first three female pilots admitted to the Israeli Air Force (IAF) pilot training course.

== Early life and education ==
Rina Levinson-Adler was born in Tel Aviv, Israel on 27 April 1927. From the age of 14, she flew gliders at the club at Tel Aviv Airport.

She earned her civilian pilot's licence in 1946 and studied aerospace engineering in the United States. While studying in the US, she got her pilot's licence for twin-engine aircraft and took a course in skydiving.

== Flying career ==
On her return to Israel in 1951, she was admitted to the Israeli Air Force (IAF) pilot training course along with two other women, Ya'el Rom-Finkelstein and Ruth Bokbinder. Levinson did not complete the training, but her civilian licences were recognised and she was assigned as a sergeant, later becoming a sergeant-major pilot serving in 147 Squadron, a reconnaissance and transport squadron with light aircraft such as the Boeing-Stearman PT-13 'Kaydet'. The unit was led by Captain Meir Shefer and had 25 aircraft but only 12 pilots, all reservists and civilian pilots. The squadron operated from IAF airbase at Mazkeret Batya. During the Suez Crisis in 1956, the squadron was transferred to the base at Ramla.

During the Suez Crisis in 1956, in operation Machbesh (מכבש) Levinson and Ya'el Rom-Finkelstein flew 2 of the 16 C-47 Dakotas that carried the 395 paratroopers of the 890th Parachute Battalion of the 202nd Parachute Brigade to the Mitla Pass, the first action of the Second Arab-Israeli War. Later during the same conflict, in Operation "קדש" (Kadesh), the Israeli operations in the Sinai Peninsula, she flew Stearman Kaydets and was the regular liaison pilot with the commander of the French Air Force.

In 1957, she earned her D-licence at the same time as well-known French aviators Suzanne Jannin and Valerie André.

After leaving the IAF, Levinson founded Monavir Air Taxi & Charter Service in the early 1960s, an airline that operated Cessnas from the then small airport near Jerusalem.

Levinson also flew gliders and took part in gliding competitions. In 1964, she received the Paul Tissandier Diploma from the Fédération Aéronautique Internationale (FAI), awarded to individuals who have particularly served aviation, especially private and sport aviation, through their work, initiative, dedication or other efforts.

Levinson-Adler continued to work as a civilian flight instructor until 1998.

She was also active in The Ninety-Nines, an international non-profit organisation for women in aviation.

Rina Levinson-Adler died on 11 April 2021.

== Images ==
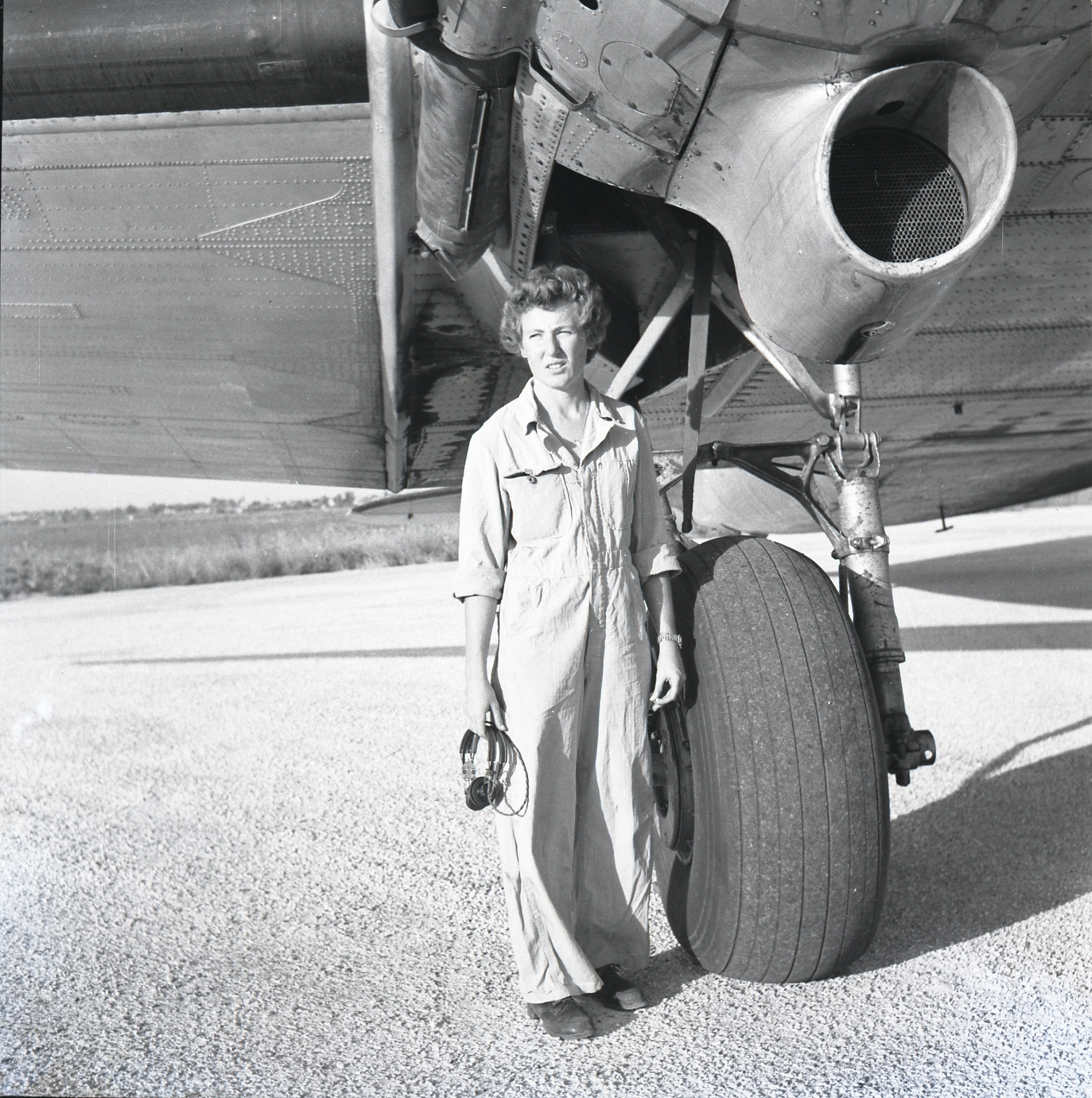
Rina Levinson

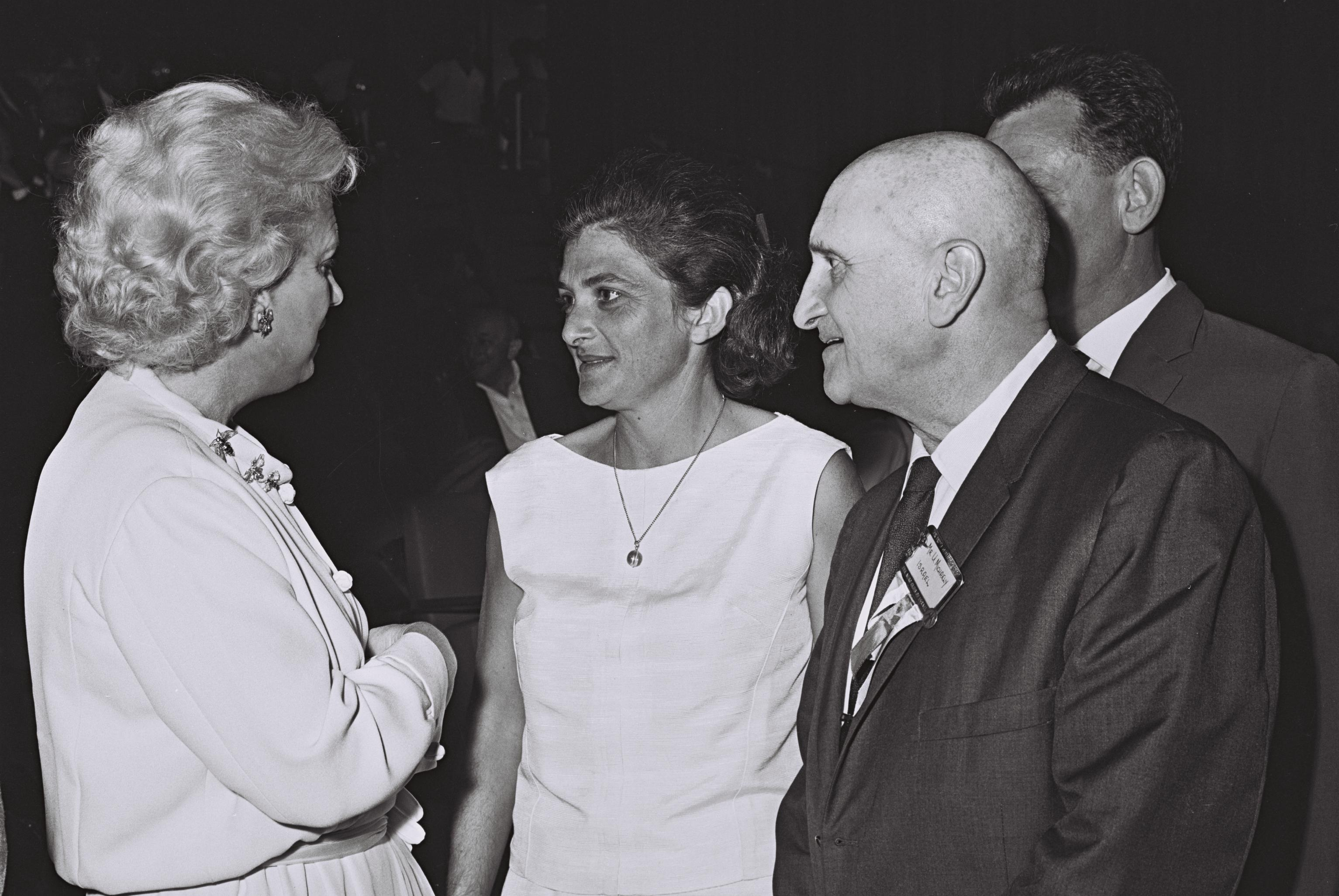
Mrs. Jacqueline Cochran of USA with Israel delegates miss Rina Levinson and U. Michaely at the 57th FAI conference in Rehovot

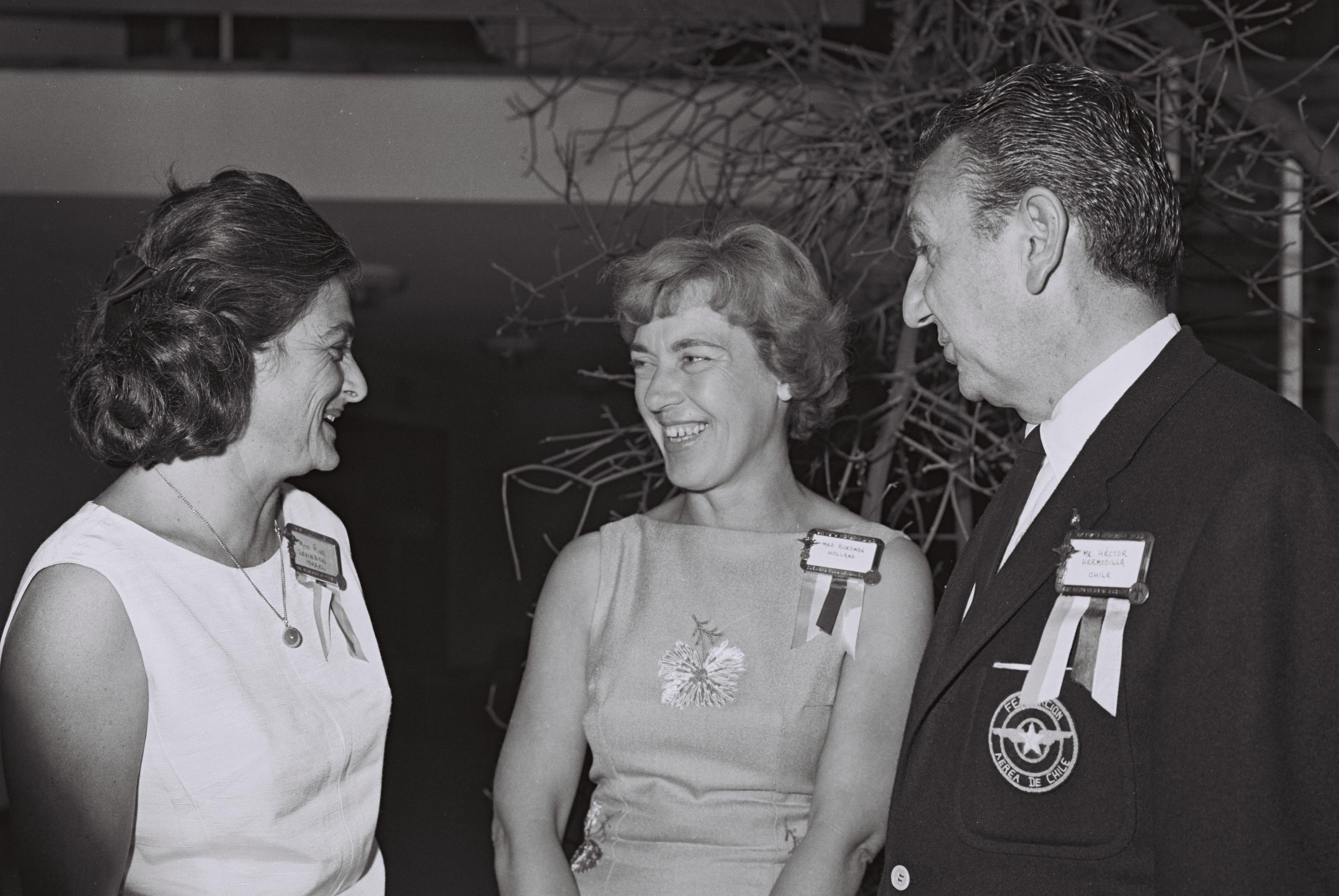
Mrs. Nini Boesman of Netherlands and Mr. Hector Harmosilla of Chile with Israel delegate Miss Rina Levinson at the 57th FAI conference in Rehovot
