= Anna Levinson =

German zoologist (1939–2015)

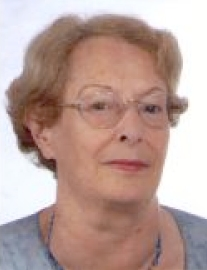
- Born: January 8, 1939; Tel Aviv, Mandatory Palestine
- Died: May 13, 2015 (aged 76)
- Education: Hebrew University of Jerusalem (M.S. 1964, Ph.D. 1972)
- Scientific career
- Fields: Zoology, entomology
- Doctoral advisor: Ezekiel Rivnay, Rachel Galun

Anna Levinson (January 8, 1939 – May 13, 2015) was a German zoologist who specialized in general and applied entomology. She worked at the Max Planck Institute for Behavioral Physiology from 1971, and at the Max Planck Institute for Ornithology from 2004 in Seewiesen and Erling (Upper Bavaria, Germany).

== Life ==
Born in Tel-Aviv, she graduated from the Hebrew University of Jerusalem, Faculty of Science, with a Ph.D. on June 6, 1972. She was awarded the Karl Leopold Escherich-Medal on February 26, 2OO7 in Innsbruck, Austria by DGaaE (Deutsche Gesellschaft für allgemeine und angewandte Entomologie).

Levinson was the daughter of the Engineer Isaac Bar-Ilan and the Mathematician Frieda Bar-Ilan. After graduating from a mathematics - and science – oriented Gymnasium, she earned a teaching diploma and taught biology at a junior High School. She studied botany, zoology, parasitology, chemistry, and graduated with the degree of M.Sc. (Magister Scientiarum) from the Faculty of Science of the Hebrew University of Jerusalem in 1964. Within her M.Sc. research, she investigated the sound patterns and corresponding behavioural responses produced by Locusta migratoria and Schistocerca gregaria (Acrididae, Caelifera).

She also performed doctoral research under the supervision of Professors R. Galun and E. Rivnay on the possible utilization of insect attractants and repellents for suppressing the density of harmful insect populations, particularly in the phytophagous cotton leafworm Spodoptera littoralis (Noctuidae, Lepidoptera), the haematophagous bedbug Cimex lectularius (Cimicidae, Hemiptera) and the cereal feeding khapra beetle Trogoderma granarium (Dermestidae, Coleoptera). Eventually she received the degree of Ph.D. from the Hebrew University of Jerusalem in 1972.

Between 1965 and 1968 Anna Levinson delivered courses of entomology to students at the Hebrew University of Jerusalem. She also performed research on the biological control of pest insect populations, particularly the scale insect Parlatoria blanchardii (Coccoidea, Stenorrhyncha) utilizing various species of the coccinellid genera Chilocorus and Scymnus. She also investigated the aggregation and dispersal behaviour of the bedbug species Cimex lectularius and eventually discovered the intraspecific assembling and alarm pheromones of the above hemipteran.

In 1971, she became a research associate of the Max Planck Institute for Behavioural Physiology (Seewiesen, Upper Bavaria) and performed research, together with her husband Hermann Levinson, on the nutritional and sensory physiology of certain harmful insect and mite species, particularly on the molecular structure and mode of action of kairomones, sex pheromones and other stimuli of possible value in producing insectistasis and acaristasis. Insectistasis depends on the use of pheromones to trap, confuse or inhibit mating, in order to keep pest populations below a level, in which they may cause significant economic damage. Since 1988, Anna Levinson and Hermann Levinson are working together on the ethnozoology of harmful and harmless animal species prevalent in the ancient Orient and classical Antiquity.

== Achievements ==
Anna Levinson has collaborated with national and international research teams like those of Wittko Francke, Christoph Reichmuth, Kenji Mori, Robert M. Silverstein and Konstantin Buchelos investigating the mode of action and employment of pheromone traps for stored product beetles and moths, particularly khapra beetles, hide beetles, tobacco beetles, grain moths, meal moths, flour moths, tobacco moths as well as almond moths. These traps were eventually patented in numerous countries and are routinely used until now. They significantly reduce the number of insecticidal treatments required in the storage environment. In total she wrote more than 100 scientific papers.

== Awards ==
Anna Levinson is a member of the German Society of general and applied Entomology (DGaaE) as well as the Entomological Society of Munich (MEG). Because of her numerous achievements and publications, she received worldwide recognition as a Leading Scientist of the World for 2006, rendered by the International Biographical Centre of Cambridge, England. She was also awarded the Honorary Medal of Karl Leopold Escherich, rendered by Gerald Moritz, President of the German Society of general and applied Entomology (DGaaE) in 2007.

== Works about Hermann and Anna Levinson ==
- "Alfred Elbert - Laudatio für Frau Dr. Anna Levinson und Herrn Professor Dr. Hermann Levinson anlässlich der Verleihung der Karl-Escherich-Medaille der Deutschen Gesellschaft für allgemeine und angewandte Entomologie am 26. Februar 2007 in Innsbruck"., Mitt. Dtsch. Ges. allg. angew. Ent. 16, 2008, p. 9
- "Magic Spells to combat Pests". Gottfried Plehn, Max-Planck-Research, pages 58–61.(2OO2)
- Gutsmiedel, D. 2OO3: Die ägyptischen Plagegeister. Bild der Wissenschaft 6, 7O-72
