= Mary Levison =

First female Queen's Chaplain in the Church of Scotland

- Born: Mary Irene Lusk; 8 January 1923; Oxford
- Died: 12 September 2011 (aged 88); Edinburgh
- Resting place: Grange Cemetery
- Education: University of Oxford; University of Edinburgh
- Known for: lobbying for the ordination of women in the Church of Scotland first woman Queen's Chaplain
- Spouse: Rev Frederick Levison
- Family: Janet Lusk (sister); David Levison (father-in-law)

Mary Irene Levison (8 January 1923 – 12 September 2011) was the first person to petition the Church of Scotland for the ordination of women to the Ministry of Word and Sacrament in 1963. This was achieved five years later and Levison became a minister in 1973. In 1991 she was appointed as Queen's Chaplain, the first woman to hold the position.

== Life ==
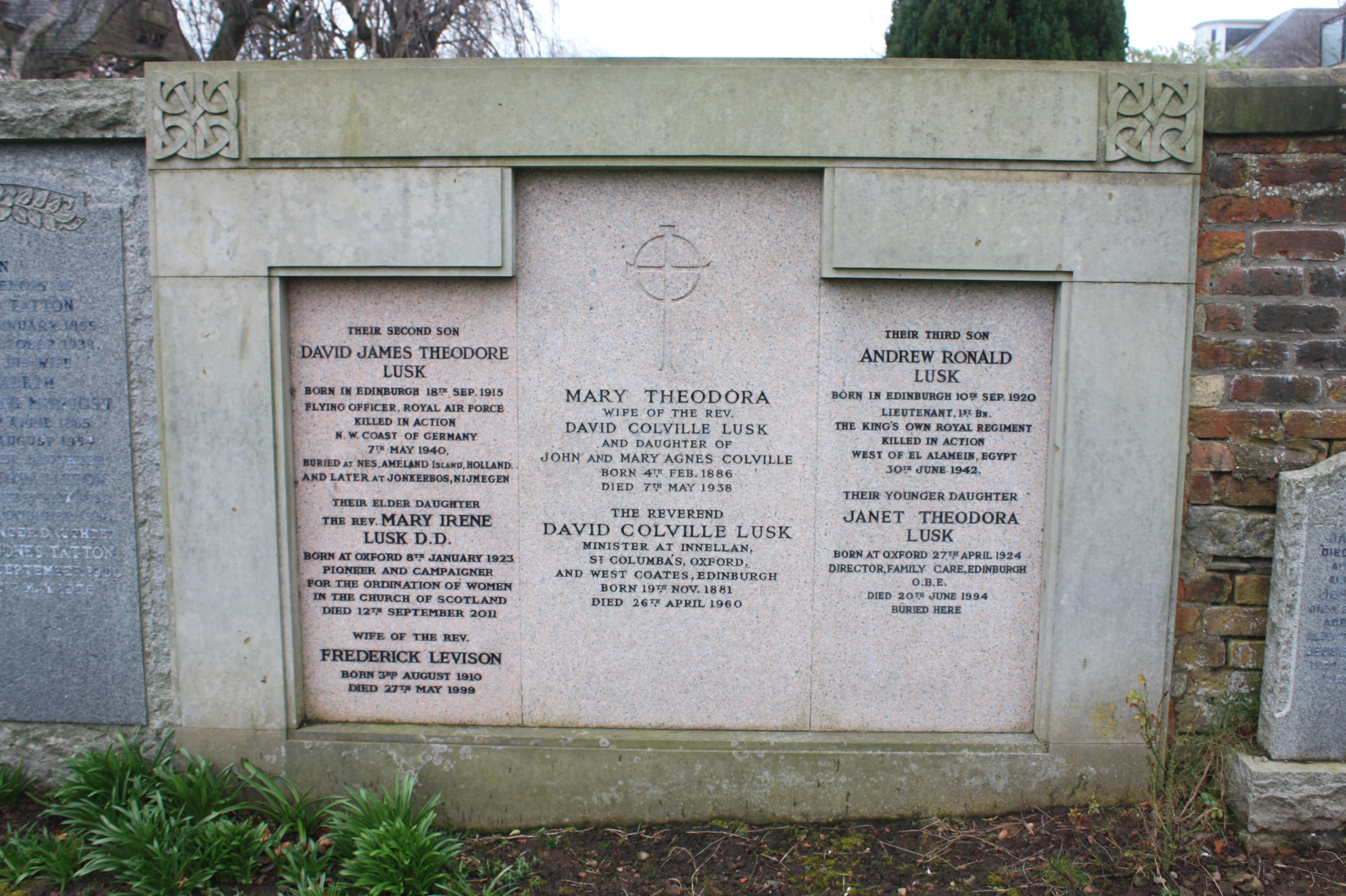
The grave of Mary Levison, Grange Cemetery, Edinburgh

Born Mary Irene Lusk in Oxford on 8 January 1923, she was the fourth child of Mary Theodora Colville, and her husband Reverend David Colville Lusk (1881-1960). Her father was ordained in the United Free Church and at the time of her birth was the Chaplain to the Presbyterian members of the University of Oxford. One of her siblings was the pioneering social worker Janet Lusk (1924 - 1994).

She attended the Oxford High School for Girls for her early education. When the family moved from Oxford to Edinburgh she attended St Monica's School. While there she sat the entrance examination for St Leonard's School in St Andrews which she attended from the age of 13.

She returned to her home town of Oxford for university, studying at undergraduate level at Lady Margaret Hall from 1941. Here she gained a first class degree in philosophy, politics and economics.

As part of her training to be a deaconess (licensed to preach) she returned to Edinburgh to attend St Colm's College and studied for the Bachelor of Divinity at New College (the Faculty of Divinity in the University of Edinburgh). She was awarded a Distinction in Systematic Theology and the Aitken Fellowship which enabled her to spend a semester in Heidelberg and a semester in Basel.

== Work in the Church of Scotland ==
She was appointed as Deaconess in St Michael's Church in Inveresk, Musselburgh near Edinburgh in 1954 where she served for 4 years.

In 1958 she returned to St Colm's College taking up the post of tutor teaching Christian Doctrine, New Testament Studies and the practical training of the deaconess students.

On Saturday 26 May 1963 Mary Lusk stood at the Bar of the General Assembly of the Church of Scotland to test her call to ministry. The Moderator overseeing the proceedings was the Very Rev James Stuart Stewart. She was given 15 minutes to present her petition to the General Assembly. Her petition was for her Ordination to the Ministry of Word and Sacrament. Her petition was received by the Assembly which instructed the Panel on Doctrine to consider its response and report to the following General Assembly.

In 1967 six women wrote an open letter to call on the Church of Scotland to allow the ordination of women. The six were Lusk, Elizabeth G. K. Hewat, Margaret Forrester, Claude Barbour, Mary Weir and Sheila Spense (then named White). The six found that they were not allowed to lobby the men who were making the decision - so they decided to hold a press conference. The YMCA lent them a room and the press were invited (but they were not expected in any numbers). On the day the room was packed and the six and their petition was in the press. The debate continued that year, but on 22 May 1968 women's ordination was approved. Levison became a minister in 1973.

== Family and later life ==
In 1965 she married Reverend Frederick Levison and they moved to the Scottish Borders. When he retired in 1977 they returned to Edinburgh and she then became involved in pastoral care at St Andrew's and St George's Church, Edinburgh.

She was appointed a Chaplain to Her Majesty in Scotland in 1991, and was the first female minister in this role. In 1993 she stood unsuccessfully as Moderator of the General Assembly of the Church of Scotland. She was awarded an honorary doctorate (DD) by the University of Edinburgh in 1994.

She died in Edinburgh on 12 September 2011 and is buried with her parents and other family members in Grange Cemetery. The grave lies on the western wall of the west extension.

Her papers and correspondence are housed at the National Library of Scotland.

== Publications ==
- Wrestling with the Church (1992) autobiography

== See also ==
- Ordination of women in the Church of Scotland
