= Nan Levinson =

American writer and teacher (born 1949)

- Born: 1949 (age 76–77); Syracuse, New York
- Occupations: Writer, journalist, teacher

Nan Levinson (born 1949) is an American writer, journalist and teacher. Her writing focuses on civil and human rights, military culture, the arts, and communication technology. Her books include War Is Not a Game: The New Antiwar Soldiers and the Movement They Built and Outspoken: Free Speech Stories. Levinson was the first U.S. correspondent for the Index on Censorship.

== Career ==
=== Writing ===
Levinson's reporting, commentary, and fiction have appeared in print and online platforms including the New York Times, Boston Globe, Los Angeles Times, Women’s Review of Books, In These Times, Boston Phoenix, SuperLawyer, American Way, tomdispatch, and Huffington Post, where she is a featured blogger on military culture and peace work. She was on the masthead of the London-based magazine Index on Censorship from 1988 to 1995, and speaks in forums on free expression and political activism around the U.S.

Outspoken: Free Speech Stories, Levinson's first book, examines the state of free expression in America from 1985 to 2000 through the stories of 20 people caught in free speech controversies.

War Is Not a Game: The New Antiwar Soldiers and the Movement They Built, her 2014 book, follows Iraq Veterans Against the War (IVAW), Veterans For Peace (VFP), Military Families Speak Out (MFSO) and other military-related war resisters who banded together to stop the wars in Iraq and Afghanistan.

=== Teaching ===
Levinson is a lecturer in English at Tufts University, where she has taught journalism and fiction writing since 1988. Previously, she taught writing at Harvard University's Kennedy School of Government and Bentley University and was a guest lecturer in arts management at Sangamon State University (now University of Illinois Springfield).

=== Nonprofit management ===
From 1973 to 1983, Levinson worked in nonprofit management, principally in arts administration. She was executive director of the British American Arts Association/US; assistant program director of state programs at the National Endowment for the Arts; coordinator of community services at the Arts Extension Service at the University of Massachusetts/Amherst; and associate producer at Windham Summer Repertory Theatre. She also worked with Foxfire Vermont and the Instituto Norte Andino de Ciencias Sociales in Colombia.

== Related activities ==
Somerville Arts Council, advisory board
Truth Commission on Conscience in War
Free Expression Policy Project, advisory board
Winter Soldier: Iraq and Afghanistan, publicity committee
Tufts part-time faculty, organizing committee
Tufts University film and media studies executive board
Amnesty International US/USSR coordination group
Boston Coalition for Freedom of Expression hero list, twice

== Education ==
University of Rochester, BA in history
School for International Training Graduate Institute, Master's of International Administration
University of Manchester, England, visiting student

== Selected bibliography ==
Listen and Be Listened To (American Management Association, 1989) Rosie’s Chocolate-Packed Jam Filled Butter-Rich No-Holds-Barred Cookie Book, writer (Workman, 1991)
Electrifying Speech: New Communication Technologies and Traditional Civil Liberties (The Fund for Free Expression, 1992)
“United States,” Freedom to Publish (International Publishers Association, 1992)
The New Bostonians: An Uncommon Media Arts Tradition, guest editor, The Independent, Nov. 1994
Rosie’s All-Butter Fresh Cream Sugar-Packed No-Holds-Barred Baking Book, writer (Workman, 1996)
“What She Should Have Said,” Apostrophe, fall/winter 1996
A Democracy of Voices: Free Expression in the U.S. (The Andy Warhol Foundation Paper Series on the Arts, Culture, and Society, 1997)
“La Inocente,” Apostrophe, summer 1999
How to Sharpen Your Business Writing Skills (American Management Association, 2000, 2013)
“The Sad Pleasures of Travel,” Life Studies, 7th ed. (Bedford/St. Martin, 2001)
Outspoken: Free Speech Stories (University of California Press, 2003, paper 2005)
The Rosie's Bakery All-Butter, Cream-Filled, Sugar-Packed Baking Book, writer (Workman, 2011)
“Mad Bad Sad: What’s Really Happened to American Soldiers,” tomdispatch, 28 June 2012
War Is Not a Game: The New Antiwar Soldiers and the Movement They Built (Rutgers University Press, 2014)
“The Big Dick School of American Patriotism -- and what we make of it,” tomdispatch, 17 March 2015

== See also ==
Censorship
Conscientious Objector
Iraq Veterans Against the War
Military Families Speak Out
National Endowment for the Arts
Veterans For Peace
War resister
