= David Levison =

Church of Scotland minister

Leon David Levison (1919–2012) was a Church of Scotland minister. During the early 1970s he was Convener of the Church of Scotland's Moral and Social Welfare Board.

== Family background and early life ==
Leon David Levison was born in Edinburgh in 1919, third son of Leon and Lady Kate Levison. Leon Levison (1881–1936) was a convert from Judaism much involved with the Church of Scotland's missionary activities. Several of his descendants and relatives were subsequently to become Church of Scotland ministers, notably including his daughter-in-law, Mary Levison, who in 1973 became the first female minister ordained by the Church of Scotland. In 1942, David Levison married Cecilia, an English honours graduate. He was subsequently dispatched to St John's Kirk of Perth, where he was ordained in 1943.

== Early career ==
In 1946, Levison moved to his first parish at Gorebridge. In 1954 he joined the secretariat of the Church of Scotland's Foreign Mission Committee. Three years later he was appointed to the central parish of the new town of Glenrothes in Fife.

== Moral Welfare Board ==
In 1970, Leon David Levison was appointed Convener of the Church's Moral and Social Welfare Board. A year later, he became minister at Pentcaitland, a rural parish in East Lothian. His arrival at the Moral Welfare Board followed a period of turbulence during which the committee had adopted relatively liberal positions on matters of sex and morality which sometimes placed it at odds with those of its parent body. Under Levison's leadership, the organisation became more conservative. Much of their attention focused upon defending marriage from the perceived threat of the 'permissive society' and a prolonged campaign against 'obscenity.' In pursuit of the latter, the committee launched the Scottish Petition for Public Decency in 1972. In 1975, the Moral Welfare Board published a booklet summarising their teachings about sexualities and marriage. The booklet told of Levison's belief that marriage was being undermined by the effects of secularisation and social liberalism amongst the young and university students in particular. While these efforts had little effect in the face of changing popular attitudes, they did result in David and Cecilia being invited to represent the British Council of Churches at a conference in Tanzania, where he spoke on world population.

== Retirement ==
David Levison retired from ministry in 1982. He subsequently served as chair of the East Lothian Council of Social Service. David and Cecilia later moved to Dundee, where their eldest son had been appointed a Professor of Pathology. David Levison died aged ninety-five, a month after celebrating his golden wedding anniversary.

== Bibliography ==
L. David Levison and Ian Simpson, Today's Questions about Marriage (Edinburgh: St Andrew Press, 1975)
