= Mark Levinson =

Mark Levinson may refer to:

- Mark Levinson (audio equipment designer) (born 1946), founder of the company
  - Mark Levinson Audio Systems
- Mark Levinson (film director), director of the 2013 documentary Particle Fever
