= Mark Levenson =

- Occupations: Musical Director, Composer, and Lyricist
- Website: http://www.secondcity.com

Mark Levenson, a member of the Dramatists Guild of America, is a musical director for The Second City Detroit (located in Novi, Michigan). Levenson helped open Second City Detroit in 1993. In addition to his work with The Second City Detroit, Levenson scored the hit Comedy Central series, Strangers with Candy. He has also written music for shows on MTV, VH-1, NBC and scored productions at both Lincoln Center for the Performing Arts and John F. Kennedy Center for the Performing Arts. Levenson composed music for David Sedaris's two Off Broadway shows and numerous recording projects. He recently toured the country with Stephen Colbert, Amy Sedaris and Paul Dinello in their production of Wigfield, which concluded its run at the U.S. Comedy Arts Festival in Aspen, Colorado.

Levenson scored Carl Reiner's original children's album, Tell Me a Scary Story and also the Dr. Seuss CD series starring Kelsey Grammer and Jason Alexander. He recently scored his first radio play starring Dustin Hoffman. Levenson served as musical director for the New York avant-garde improv company, Burn Manhattan, and has composed and produced four musicals.

Before joining the Second City Detroit, Levenson spent eight years as a composer at The Second City Chicago, where he wrote the scores for six shows (including the musicals The Rate of Falling', Those Who Are Stronger, and A Life In The Day). Levenson's work has been produced in Norway and China.
