= Ludwig Lewysohn =

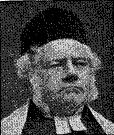
A picture of Ludvig lewysohn

Ludwig Lewysohn (15 April 1819, in Schwersenz, Posen – 26 May 1901, in Stockholm), was a German rabbi. Graduating from the Realgymnasium, Berlin, in 1843, he studied Orientalia in that city, and received his doctorate from the University of Halle in 1847, his dissertation being "De Sacrificiis Veteris Testamenti." In 1848 he became preacher at Frankfort-on-the-Oder. Three years later he was called as rabbi to Worms, where he officiated until 1858. He then accepted a call to Stockholm, where he labored from 1859 to 1893, in which year he resigned. Besides numerous contributions to Jewish periodicals (especially "Ha-Maggid"), he published "Nafshot Ẓaddiḳim" (Frankfort-on-the-Main, 1855), on the epitaphs at Worms, and "Die Zoologie des Talmuds" (ib. 1858).
