= Hermann Levinson =

German biologist and physiologist (1924–2013)

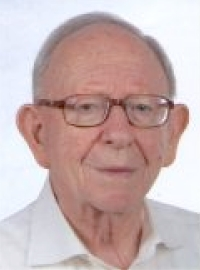
Herman Levinson (2007)

Hermann Levinson (11 January 1924 in Klingenthal, Saxony, Germany – 1 November 2013) was a German biologist and physiologist. He lived with his wife Anna Levinson in Starnberg and has worked at the Max Planck Institute for Behavioral Physiology since 1971, and at the Max Planck Institute for Ornithology since 2004, in Seewiesen and Erling (Upper Bavaria, Germany).

== Biography ==
Levinson is the only son of the high school teacher Leopold Levinson and his wife Charlotte Levinson (née Braun). In 1933, when the National Socialists (NSDAP) established a totalitarian government, the family left Germany. They first moved to Karlovy Vary and later to Prague (Czechoslovakia). Shortly after passing his Abitur examinations at an English high school in Prague, Hermann Levinson fled to Haifa (at that time, British Mandate of Palestine). He reached the coast of Haifa, and was met by British officials who transferred him to the Patria, a ship the British authorities were using to deport Jewish refugees to Mauritius. On 25 November 1940, a bomb planted by the Haganah to prevent the deportation sank the ship in Haifa harbour Patria disaster. The survivors of the shipwreck were rescued by British soldiers, received the status of "enemy alien“ and were retained in the detention camp of Atlit (approx. 20 km south of Haifa). Hermann Levinson was kept in this camp until autumn 1941.

== Scientific work ==
In October 1941, Levinson joined the Malaria Research Station of the Hebrew University (director: Prof. Dr. Gideon Mer) in Rosh Pina (Upper Galilee, Palestine) and performed examinations of the mosquito species Anopheles saccharovi, Anopheles sergentii and Anopheles superpictus for availability of the sporozoans Plasmodium falciparum, Plasmodium malariae, Plasmodium vivax or Plasmodium ovale, inhabiting the blood-sucking females of the above mosquito species. He also investigated the suppression of larval populations of Anopheline species in their aquatic breeding sites by either biological, physical or chemical measures.

At the Hebrew University of Jerusalem, Levinson studied chemistry, microbiology, zoology as well as entomology, and also investigated the development of resistance towards DDT and other organic insecticides in cyclorrhaphous fly species, wherefore he received the degree of M.Sc. in 1954. Later, he performed advanced research on the nutritional requirements and metabolism of Musca domestica var. vicina (Cyclorrhapha, Diptera) under the supervision of Professors E.D. Bergmann and G. Fraenkel, and was awarded the degree of Ph.D. from the Hebrew University of Jerusalem in 1959.

From 1959 until 1961 he worked with Sir Vincent Brian Wigglesworth on the function of dietary sterols in holometabolic and hemimetabolic insect species, at the University of Cambridge (England). In 1964 he became senior lecturer, in 1967 associate professor of comparative biochemistry and physiology at the Hebrew University of Jerusalem. Between 1962 and 1970, H. Levinson taught invertebrate physiology and biochemistry, was head of the Laboratory of Insect Physiology and supervised about a dozen M.Sc. and Ph.D. candidates, at the Hebrew University of Jerusalem. Between 1970 and 1971, he was visiting professor at the Zoological Institute of the Johann Wolfgang Goethe-University in Frankfurt/Main.

Levinson published more than 140 scientific contributions and introduced the terms insectistasis and acaristasis to applied entomology. By definition, insectistasis and acaristasis (Greek, stasis = standstill) refer to a state, wherein the population density of harmful species is suppressed to the extent of gaining harvested plants, ripe fruits and stored seeds devoid of significant damage or loss

== Awards ==
- 1960 Sir Simon Marks Award (London)
- 1980 Medal of the Korean Institute of Science (Seoul)
- 1992 Sigillo d'Oro (Piacenza)
- 2006 Leading Scientist of the World (Cambridge)
- 2007 Karl Leopold Escherich-Medal (Innsbruck)

== Memberships ==
- Lifetime Fellow, Institute of Biology (UK)
- Fellow, Royal Entomological Society (London)
- Member, New York Academy of Sciences (USA)
- German Association of general and applied Entomology (DGaaE)
- Münchner Entomologische Gesellschaft (MEG)

== Editorships of scientific journals ==
- Anzeiger für Schädlingskunde, Pflanzenschutz, Umweltschutz (Germany)
- Journal of Stored Products Research (UK)
- Rivista di Parassitologia (Italy)
