= Fredrick Levenson =

Fredrick B. Levenson (September 2, 1945, in Brooklyn, New York, – August 27, 2012, in Massapequa, New York) was an author and psychoanalyst working in Long Island. He was an educated psychoanalyst from New York University, the New School for Social Research and the Manhattan Center for Modern Psychoanalysis. He taught at the graduate level at several institutions for higher learning. He was married and has three adult children.

He specialized in treating cancer with a modified psychoanalytic approach. These methods are described in his books The causes and prevention of cancer and The anti-cancer marriage, which were published in 1985 and 1986. The causes and prevention of cancer was nominated as the American medical writers book of the year 1986.

He claimed to be able to reverse the cancer process in metastatic cancer by a success rate of complete remission in about a third of cases, and claims that almost everybody else live significantly longer with a much better quality of life. He reported this in several medical articles.
