= Catherine Levison =

Catherine Levison is the author of four books. She is also a public speaker to parenting, homeschooling and educational audiences throughout the United States and Canada. She is also a columnist for The Link magazine. Levison lives with her family in the Puget Sound region of Washington state.

== Career ==
Levison's workshops, articles, books and seminars are based on her extensive research into the teaching methods and educational philosophies of Charlotte Mason, a British educator from the last century whose techniques are currently receiving renewed interested, especially in American private and home schools.

"Homeschooling and parenting are intertwined in such a way that they can hardly be seen as separate concepts. ... As one overlaps with the other, we find that all parents are home educators to some degree." ~Catherine Levison

Levison is a frequent workshop presenter and keynote speaker at homeschooling conventions. She also conducts all-day educational how-to seminars throughout the United States and Canada for parents, teachers, and home educators.

== Publications ==
- A Charlotte Mason Education: A How-to Manual, ISBN 978-1891400162 (SourceBooks)
- More Charlotte Mason Education, ISBN 978-1891400179 (SourceBooks)
- A Literary Education: An Annontated Book List, ISBN 978-1891400230 (SourceBooks)
- "No One Ever Asked Me That; Conversations on the Afterlife", ISBN 978-0692248614
