= Streetwise (album) =

Studio album by Richard Kastle
- Released: 1991
- Recorded: Minnesota Public Radio, Studio M, St. Paul, MN
- Genre: Classical
- Length: 45:13
- Label: Virgin
- Producer: Steve Barnett

Richard Kastle chronology
''Streetwise'' (1991)	Royce Concerto (1997)

Streetwise is the debut studio album by American classical pianist Richard Kastle, released on March 5, 1991 by Virgin Records. The album has a warning label that reads: "Parental Advisory: This album contains classical music, no lyrics whatsoever." The musicians debut album was also a part of a larger scheme by Virgin Records to seek out and develop a new and younger audience for classical music. Record companies, in the early 1990s, used innovative and hip marketing techniques in an effort to attract younger audiences to classical music.

== Inception of the album ==
Kastle did not want to record an album of short works, mostly for the piano. He insisted that his first album feature the 25 minute "Royce Concerto" with an orchestra. The record company maintained that Kastle's first album needed to break even, at least, and offered to guarantee a second release if he recorded shorter works for the first album, split evenly between classics and newer Kastle compositions.

== Track listing ==
1. Hungarian Rhapsody No. 2 - Franz Liszt
2. Jesu, Joy of Man's Desiring - Johann Sebastian Bach
3. Batcave at Dusk - Richard Kastle
4. Piano Concerto No. 4, ii - Richard Kastle
5. Fantasy in F# - Richard Kastle
6. Sonata in A - Wolfgang Amadeus Mozart
7. Sonata Pathetique ii - Ludwig van Beethoven
8. Rhapsody in Blue - George Gershwin
9. Atlantis - Richard Kastle

== Credits ==
- Executive Producer: Roger Holdredge
- Produced by Steve Barnett
- Engineered by Preston Smith
- Orchestrated by Richard Kastle
- Conducted by Steve Barnett
- Art Direction: Melanie Nissen
- Design: Steve J. Gerdes
- Photography: Daniel Peebles

String Players: Romuald Teco (Concert Master), Julie Ayer, Carolyn Daws, Henley Daws, Roger Frisch, Thomas Kornacker
(Principal Second Violin), Frank Lee, Carl Nashan, John Tartaglia (Principal Viola), Tamas Strasser, Peter Howard (Principal Cello),
Joshua Koestenbaum.
