= Salmon Levinson =

American corporate lawyer and peace activist (1865–1941)

Salmon O. Levinson
- Born: Salmon Oliver Levinson; December 29, 1865
- Died: February 2, 1941 (aged 75)

Salmon Oliver Levinson (December 29, 1865 – February 2, 1941) was a practicing attorney who specialized in industrial organizations and corporate law. He was active in the peace movement in the 1920s and was responsible for drafting the Kellogg–Briand Pact, signed in 1928. Levinson noted: "We should have, not as now, laws of war, but laws against war; just as there are no laws of murder or of poisoning, but laws against them.” The treaty was the first international agreement to make war illegal. The treaty commits the parties to "condemn recourse to war for the solution of international controversies, and renounce it, as an instrument of national policy" and agree that all disputes should be settled peacefully.
