= David S. Levinson =

American novelist

- Born: David Samuel Levinson; 1969 (age 56–57)
- Education: Columbia University; The New School (MFA)
- Occupation: Short story writer

David Samuel Levinson (born 1969) is an American short story writer and novelist.

Levinson studied creative writing at Columbia University and holds a MFA from The New School.

His first novel, Antonia Lively Breaks the Silence, published by Algonquin Books, was released on June 4, 2013.

His second novel, Tell Me How This Ends Well, was published in April 2017 by Hogarth, an imprint of the Crown Publishing Group at Penguin Random House. The novel deals with the Jacobson family who gather together over Passover in L.A. The novel is set in a near-distant future, which is rife with anti-Semitism and terror.

He has been nominated several times for the Pushcart Prize and has received multiple fellowships from Yaddo, the Jentel Foundation, Ledig House, the Santa Fe Arts Institute, and the Sewanee Writers’ Conference. In 2008 to 2009 he served as the Emerging Writer Lecturer at Gettysburg College. In 2011, he won the Marguerite & Lamar Smith Fellowship for Writers. From 2013 to 2015, he served as the Fellow in Fiction at Emory University. He won an award for his fiction in The Atlantic Monthly and has published stories in slushpile, Prairie Schooner, The Brooklyn Review, Post Road, and West Branch.
