= David Pearl (performer) =

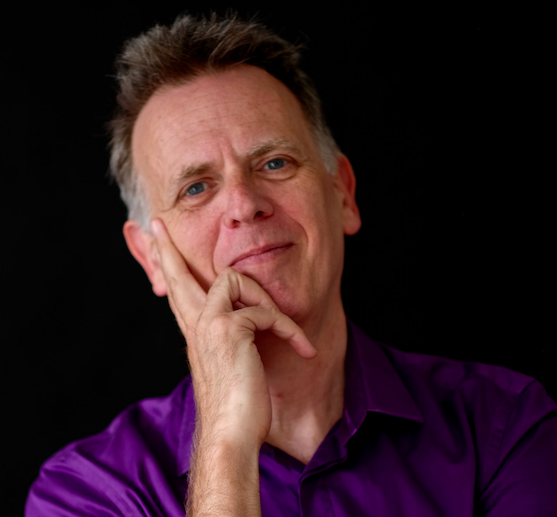
- Pearl in 2023
- Born: 1 March 1960 (age 66)
- Citizenship: British
- Education: Cambridge University
- Occupations: Author, director, Facilitator and Public Speaker
- Website: DavidPearl.net

David Pearl (born 1 March 1960) is a performer, author, director and public speaker. His book Will there be Donuts was included by The Times in their list of "top 10 Summer Reads of 2013".

He is the founder of the Pearlworks, Street Wisdom, Opera Circus, Lively Arts and Impropera companies.

== Early life ==
Pearl was first talent spotted in a North London primary school, which led to him making his singing debut with Plácido Domingo at Covent Garden, and subsequently worked at the Royal Opera House as the boy soprano soloist for 4 years. Later in his life he played Double Bass and toured as a member of the London Schools Symphony Orchestra and the National Youth Orchestra of Great Britain, before he was granted a place on the Royal College of Music Graduate course.

After completing the course, Pearl went on to study at Cambridge University. During his last year at the university, he worked as a part-time writer for Stanley Kubrick, his mentor.

== Career ==
After completing his education, Pearl worked as a below-the-line copywriter and also as an operatic tenor in the evenings. In 1991, he founded Opera Circus with Tina Ellen Lee. The Opera Circus melded opera, circus and theatre together to create a unique experience. After founding the company, Pearl performed in and was joint artistic director of this ensemble for 8 years. Their first show, 'Kill Me I Love You', was nominated for a Music award at the Edinburgh Fringe. Two notable shows came after this, 'Shameless' and 'Stag King', both of which were directed by David Glass. Both shows toured worldwide and had Arts Council and British Council backing.

In 1995 Pearl was approached to create a 1500-person development experience for a global corporation. This project led Pearl to co-found the experience engineering company Lively Arts with Jeremy Sturt. Since its foundation, created transformational events for companies such as Ericsson, Disney, Diageo, Thompson, Zurich and Dell Computers.

In 1998 Pearl founded Impropera, an improvising opera company that invents operas on the spot from the audiences' suggestions. The company performed and taught internationally, with regular performances in London's West End. Pearl helped develop the notable improvised family show, The Wobbly World of Opera, which was performed at the South Bank Centre, the Udderbelly Festival and at the Theatre Royal in Bath.

In 2001, the Pearlworks (formerly Pearl Group) was founded by Pearl to design and stage events. The company went on to work Internationally, with Pearl at the forefront. He became a creative consultant for GlaxoSmithKline, BP and Barclays, and worked as a meeting designer and facilitator.

In 2009, Pearl founded a not-for-profit social enterprise called Street Wisdom in collaboration with Chris Baréz-Brown, he has developed the urban educational venture into an international, volunteer-led, movement active in more than 90 countries.

== Educational Activity ==
While part of the Opera Circus, he undertook a 6-year theatre project in partnership with the LIFE Festival, working with three orphanages in Vilnius, Lithuania. Here Pearl re-worked performances of Carmen and The Carnival of the Animals. The Festival culminated in a mass performance of The Conference of the Birds, staged in the departures lounge of Vilnius Airport.

Pearl is a member of the European advisory board of the US-based Wisdom University, and a mentor at the School for Communication Arts, London.

== Television ==
In 1994 Pearl presented a prime time TV series about music for BBC2 called The Score. In 2005, he created a documentary film called Bloomin Human, showing how he and his team worked in Easington. The film was aired on Finnish television in 2006.

== Personal life ==
Pearl met Joanna, his wife and partner of 20 years, when he was sent to serenade under her window.

== Books ==
- Will there be Donuts? (2012)
- Story For Leaders (2016)
- Wanderful (2020)
