= Florence Vandamm =

British photographer (1883–1966)

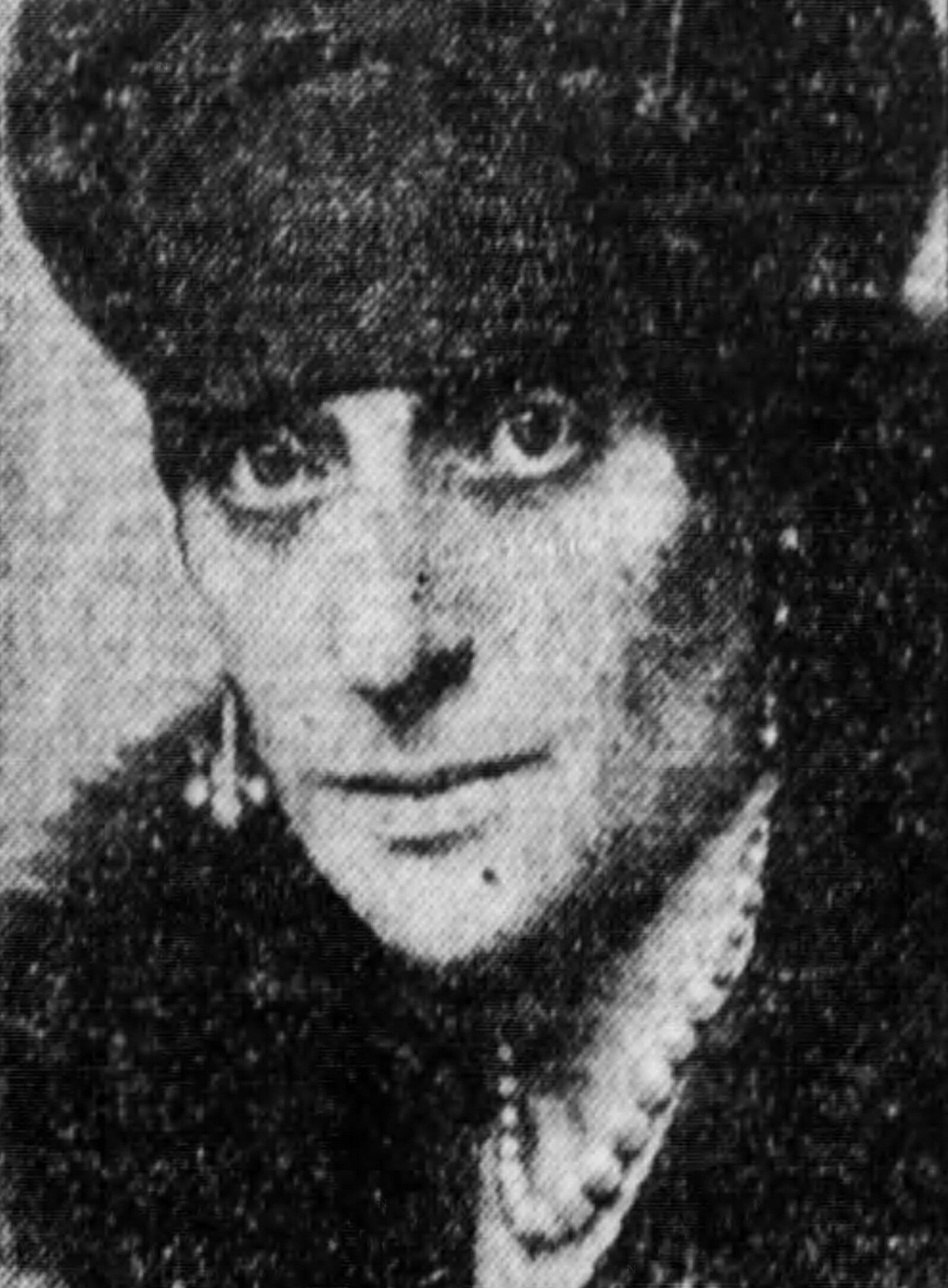
Florence Vandamm, c. 1928

Florence Catherine Vandamm (1883 – 15 March 1966) was a British photographer known for her portraiture for Broadway theatre. During her five-decade career, Vandamm and her studio photographed over 2,000 productions. She was trained in painting at the Royal Academy of Arts, ran her own studio, and was elected a fellow of the Royal Photographic Society of Great Britain before moving to the United States in 1923.

She lived in New York, where she was the official photographer for the Theatre Guild, until her death in 1966. Her photography was the subject of the 2013 exhibition Poet of Light: Florence Vandamm & the Vandamm Studio at the New York Public Library.

== Early life and education ==
Florence Vandamm (also spelled Van Damm) was born in 1883 in London to Jeannette and George Vandamm. Her father was a lawyer. Her younger brother Vivian Van Damm became the owner of the Windmill Theatre in Soho in the 1940s. Her niece Sheila van Damm was a rally driver.

Florence studied fine arts and painting at the Royal Academy of Arts.

== Career ==
=== Photography in London ===
Vandamm was a painter and miniaturist before transitioning to photography. She was employed as a portrait photographer, opening her own studio in the West End of London in 1908. She focussed on portraits of authors and musicians. Her work appeared on book jackets, in concert flyers, and in periodicals. Her studio served as a social hub for artists and performers.

Vandamm participated in competitions of the Royal Photographic Society and won awards at major exhibitions. An article from October 1911 in Greater London Illustrated said of Vandamm that "She has not unjustly been called one of the Rembrandts of Modern Photography." She was an activist in the movement for women's suffrage and contributed twenty platinotypes to a 1914 exhibition by the Union of Women's Suffrage. Her portraits of suffragists and actresses led to her work being featured in magazines. While in London, she did work for the magazines Vanity Fair and Vogue.

In 1919, she and her sister-in-law Natalie, wife of Vivian Van Damm, applied for a license to open a dancehall in Paddington.

=== Marriages ===
She married her first husband, the actor Leonard Notcutt, in 1915, and was widowed when he was killed in action in May 1917.

In the autumn of 1917, she met George R. Thomas, who was born in Washington and had been stationed in England since 1915, making small engine parts for the British Air Board. They married in early 1919 and had one son, Robert, in 1920. She taught her husband photography and they formed a professional partnership, with George using the name "Tommy Vandamm". Florence specialized in studio portraits, while George took photographs of performers on stage.

In 1919, she was elected a fellow of the Royal Photographic Society of Great Britain.

=== Broadway and the United States ===
Due to the unfavourable economic environment in England following the depression of 1920–1921, in 1923 Vandamm and her husband moved to New York where she found work with a magazine. She made connections there with Irene and Alice Lewisohn, photographing performers in the early modern dance and experimental music scenes associated with the Neighborhood Playhouse theatre. She created portraits of dance pioneers, including Martha Graham, Charles Weidman, and Doris Humphrey.

Vandamm was then hired as a backup photographer for productions of New York's Theatre Guild. The guild's official photographer, Francis Bruguière, had been "erratic in the performance of his duties", and his work was eventually supplanted by Vandamm Studio. The Vandamms earned a reputation among Broadway theatres for their quality and efficiency.

Vandamm successfully managed the performing arts studio through the Great Depression. The studio was responsible for portrait photography as well as photo documentation of productions. She took photographs of groups of actors, depicting major moments in the plot, as well as stage crews, songwriting and production teams, and the finished sets. Vandamm was known to watch rehearsals prior to producing photographs for the productions.

Photocalls with Vandamm were a theatrical tradition for Broadway actors. Actors would arrive in costume at her studio on West 57th Street. Her portraits were often of traditional poses, using minimal makeup. According to the New York Public Library, Vandamm is often said to have "invented" the head shot. Vandamm photographed numerous celebrities during her career, including Katharine Hepburn, Tennessee Williams, Dorothy Parker, Marlon Brando, Harpo Marx, Gregory Peck, and Leonard Bernstein.

Vandamm's photography was known for its technical quality, particularly her choice of camera angles and skilful use of shadow and light. Her lighting techniques allowed her to explore its emotional and sculptural qualities. She employed a large-format camera on a tripod.

Vandamm was "one of the most prolific and widely published female commercial photographers of the early 20th century". Vandamm Studio produced photographs of over 2,000 productions from 1930 to 1950. Vandamm spent the majority of her career in New York. During the summer of 1928, she travelled to Hollywood where she photographed subjects in over 60 sittings over a five-week period. In 1937, the Museum of the City of New York staged an exhibition of Vandamm's photographs of 56 musicals and plays entitled New York Theatre Productions as Photographed by Vandaam, 1923-37. During the golden age of Broadway musicals, Vandamm was the principal photographer of theatre.

=== Later life and death ===
Vandamm's husband died in 1944, and their son died in 1946. Following her retirement in 1950, Vandamm's archives, including her prints, key sheets, and negatives, were purchased for $73,000 by the New York Public Library in 1961.

Florence Vandamm died of a stroke on 15 March 1966, at Doctors Hospital in New York City. The Vandamm Collection is held by The New York Public Library for the Performing Arts.

== Gallery ==
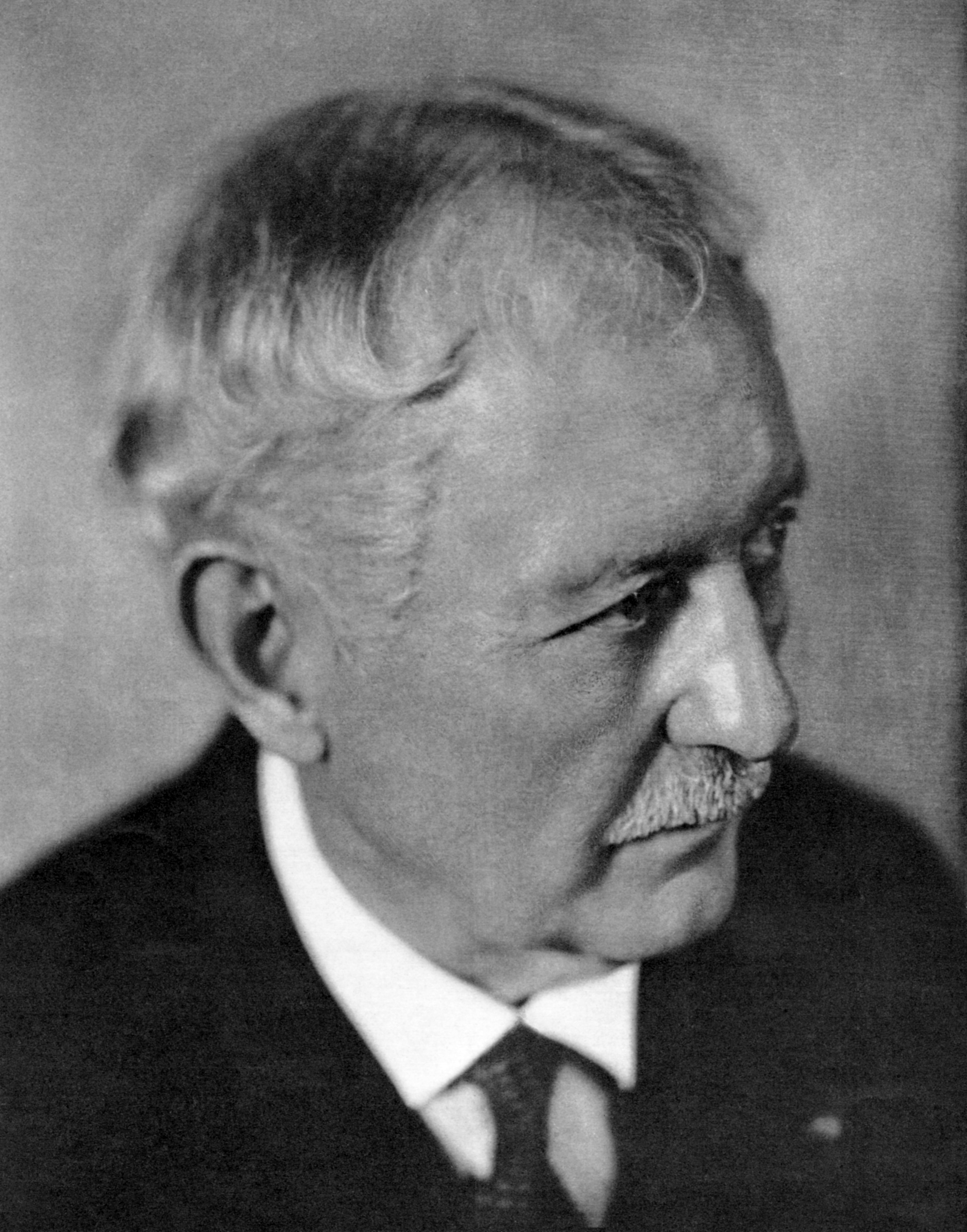
Henry Wilson Savage

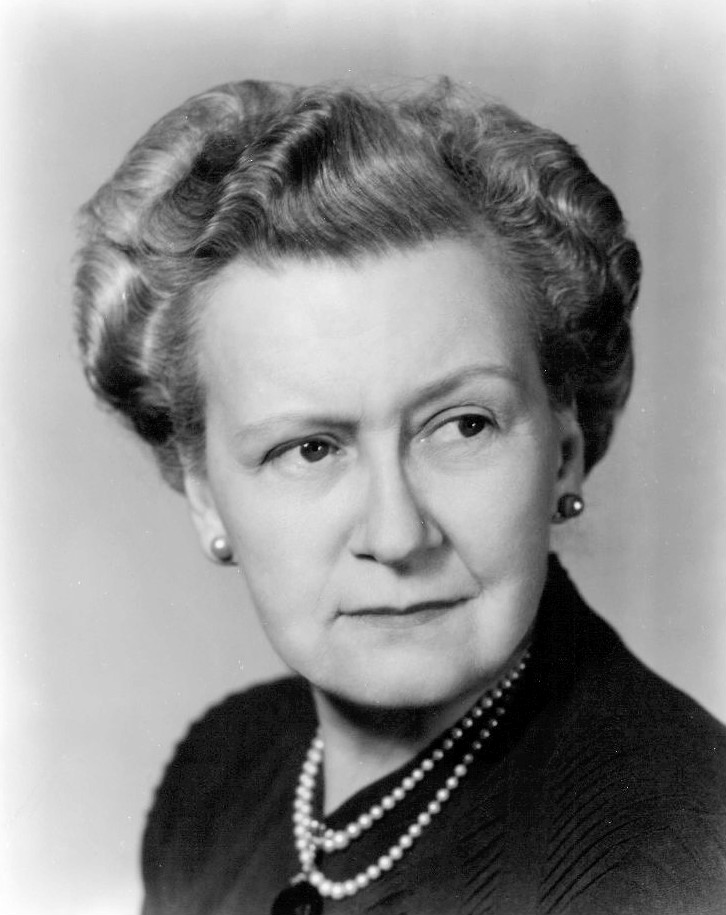
Lucile Watson

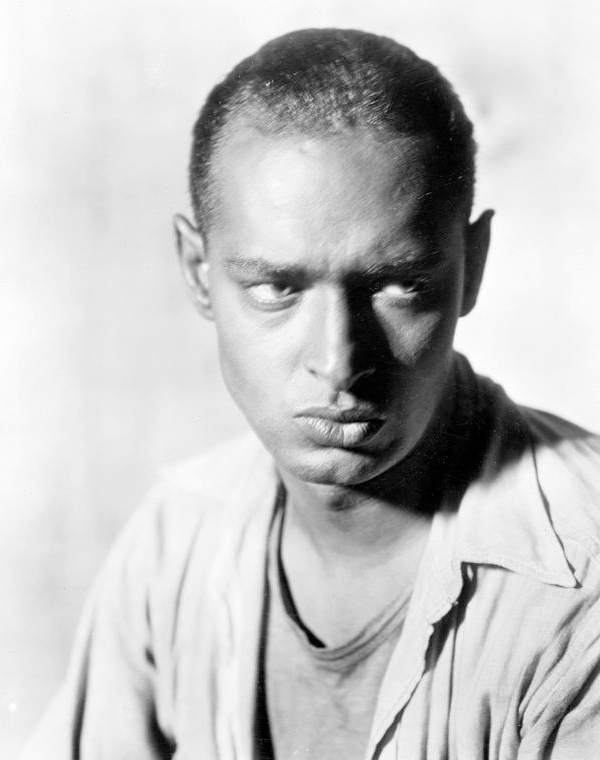
Jack Carter

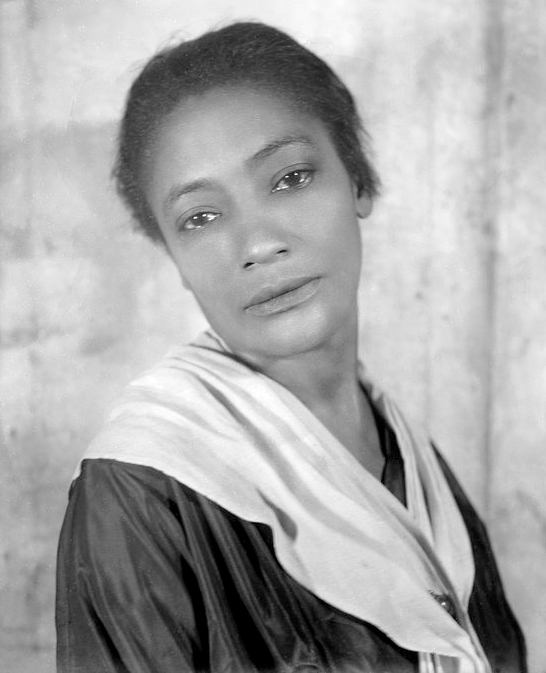
Rose McClendon

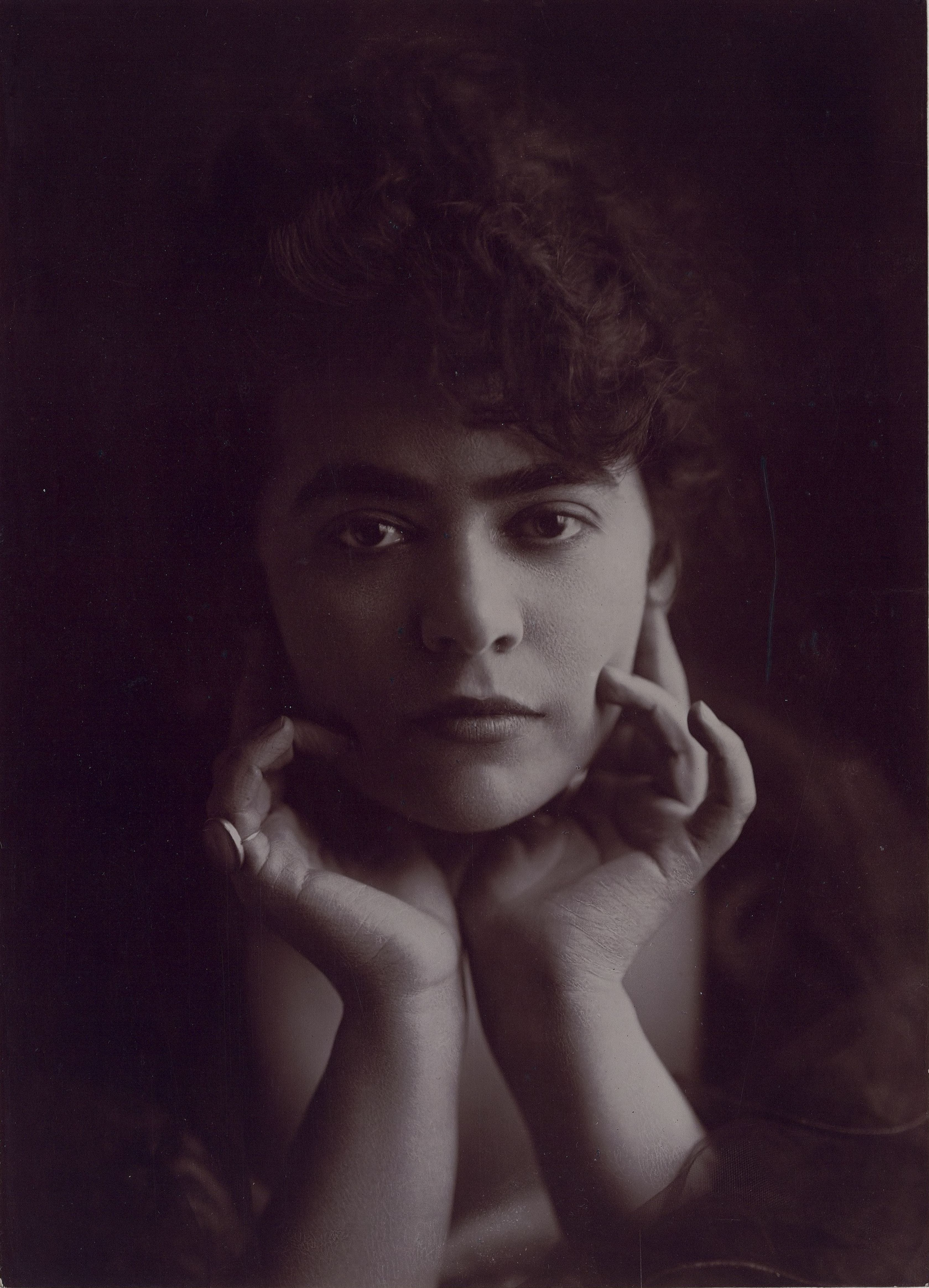
Zoïa Rosowska

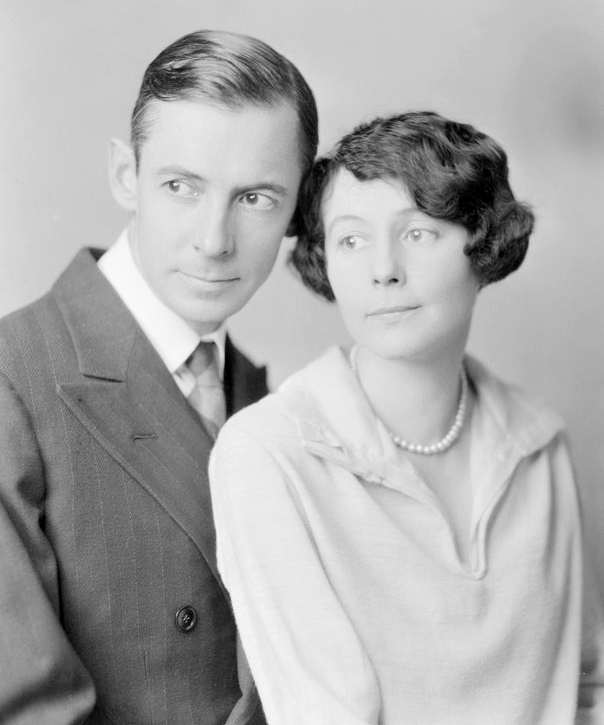
DuBose and Dorothy Heyward

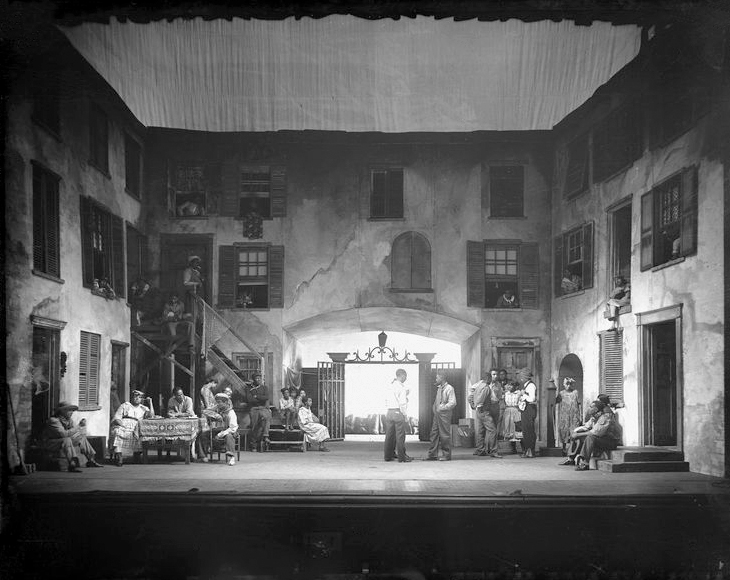
Catfish Row set from Porgy
