= Jesse Lewisohn =

American businessman (1872–1918)

- Born: July 8, 1871; New York City, U.S.
- Died: November 30, 1918 (aged 47); New York City, U.S.
- Spouse: Edna McCauley
- Parent: Leonard Lewisohn
- Relatives: Lillie Lewisohn Vogel (sister); Alice Lewisohn (sister); Irene Lewisohn (sister); Adolph Lewisohn (uncle); Adele Lewisohn Lehman (cousin); Sam A. Lewisohn (cousin)

Jesse Lewisohn (July 8, 1871 – November 30, 1918), was an American businessman involved in copper trading with Lewisohn Brothers, and an owner of racehorses.

== Biography ==
Lewisohn was born in 1872 to Leonard Lewisohn and he had the following siblings: Walter Lewisohn, Frederick Lewisohn, Oscar Lewisohn (1884–1917), Lillie A. Lewisohn, Alice Lewisohn, and Irene Lewisohn. In 1908 he was in a car with Lillian Russell and the car hit Sylvester T. Corning, the subsequent court case was settled by the New York Supreme Court. His father is of Jewish background.

Lewisohn married Edna McCauley in Atlantic City, New Jersey. She had been a friend and companion of millionaire Diamond Jim Brady.

Lewisohn died during the Spanish influenza outbreak on November 30, 1918, at the Netherland Hotel in New York City.
