= Helen Arthur =

American theatre manager

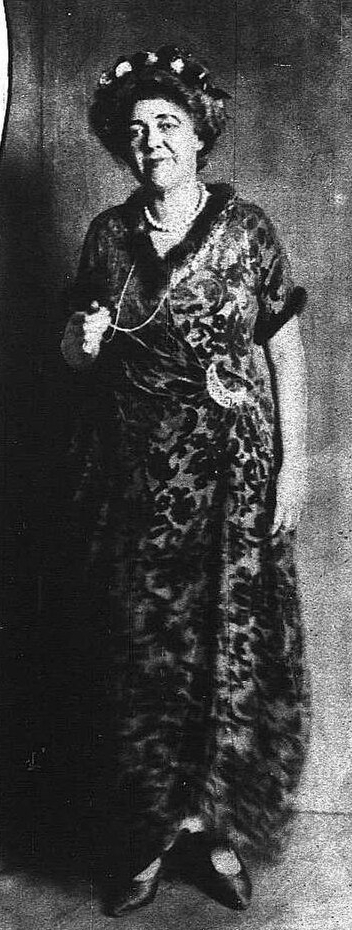
- Arthur c. 1929
- Born: March 29, 1879; Lancaster, Wisconsin, U.S.
- Died: December 9, 1939 (aged 60); New York City, U.S.
- Education: New York University
- Occupation: Theatre manager
- Partner: Agnes Morgan

Helen Arthur (March 29, 1879 – December 9, 1939) was a theatre manager, known for managing the Neighborhood Playhouse for thirteen seasons (1915–1927). Arthur was the manager of several notable actors, including Ruth Draper.

== Early life and education ==
Helen Jean Arthur was born March 29, 1879, in Lancaster, Wisconsin, to Lemuel John Arthur (a lawyer) and Mary Emma Ziegler Arthur. She attended Evanston Township High School, followed by a year at Northwestern University (1897–1898), and received a Bachelor of Law degree from New York University in 1901. Supposedly she was the first woman to try a criminal case in New York State. During her time in law practice she co-authored the handbook "Domestic Employment: A Handbook" which sought to explain applicable laws to an area which was subject to abuse.

== Theater ==
Helen Arthur's legal work brought her into contact with Lillian Wald of the Henry Street Settlement. Arthur was in residence at the Settlement during 1906, and was one of two people known to have had romantic relationships with Wald. The two vacationed together during August and September 1906. While practicing law Arthur began writing theatre reviews for a small publication. She soon gave up her law practice and became the agent for actress Grace George. She performed secretarial work for the theatrical managers, the Shubert brothers Lee and Jacob J. Shubert. A 1915 notice in Variety announced her leaving the Shuberts brothers "after seven or eight years." The notice also mentioned that Arthur, an "occasional authoress," had written a skit based on the Shuberts featuring characters Jake and Lee and that Arthur had taken the "Jake" part.

By 1915, Alice Lewisohn (later Alice Crowley) and her sister Irene Lewisohn were in need of legal help for their nascent theatrical project, the Neighborhood Playhouse. Alice called upon Arthur to assist her, becoming part of the staff, despite Sarah Cowell Le Moyne's (the head teacher) distaste for "all feminists who invade the profession of men." A 1916 article in Variety described Arthur as publicity director. Arthur was responsible for introducing Agnes Morgan (by that time her partner) to Lewisohn, who went on to become one of the Playhouse's most significant directors. In her memoir of the Playhouse, Lewisohn (now Crowley) described Arthur as "lithe, shirt-waisted, and stiff-colored Helen Arthur, dapper, bright-eyed, keen; and her friend the quiet, serious, watchful Agnes Morgan." A Playhouse performer described her as "quite a pixie, bright as a whistle, and a little devilish too." Of the relationship between Arthur and Agnes Morgan, another Playhouse performer said they "were a lesbian couple; just everyone knew."

Helen Arthur also engaged in pursuits outside of the Playhouse. In 1916 she was the manager for actress Doris Keane. In 1918 Arthur managed the Over There Theatre League in which a number of actors sailed for France and England to perform for the troops stationed there.

She was director of the Casino Theatre in Newport, Rhode Island, from 1935 to 1939 during its summer seasons. The plays she produced there included At Marian's (with Laurette Taylor), Night in the House and two plays written by Morgan, If Love Were All and Grandpa (written under the pseudonym Cutler Hatch). In 1936 she and Morgan joined the Popular Price Unit of the Federal Theatre Project where they presented American Holiday, Thirteenth Chair and Class of '29. In 1938 and 1939 she was appointed executive director of the Ann Arbor Dramatic Season for 1938.

=== Actor-Managers, Inc. ===
After the Neighborhood Playhouse closed in 1927, Helen Arthur and Agnes Morgan formed their own company, Actor-Managers, Inc. Arthur continued to manage notable actresses including Mrs. Patrick Campbell, Florence Roberts as well as the singer Marion Kirby and dancer Angna Enters. She managed Ruth Draper for ten years, from 1929 until her death in 1939.

== Activism ==
Arthur was an active proponent of non-profit theatre. In 1924 she gave a talk on "The Rebellious Theatre" before the Society for Ethical Culture. Arthur expounded on producing plays as "real worth-while things, giving consideration to the playwrights, actors and public." Two directors whom she classified as "rebellious" were Arthur Hopkins and George C. Tyler. In 1927 Arthur participated in the fifth annual "Little Theatre Tournament," given under the auspices of the Manhattan Little Theatre Club. In her presentation, Arthur spoke against "selfish theatre" (the euphemism she used for commercial theatre) which she felt was against the objectives of artistic theatre. She came down on the side of what she called "insurgent theatre" (evidently the kind of theatre that had been produced by the Neighborhood Playhouse), and took commercial managers to task for ignoring public opinion and over-charging attendees.

=== Committee Against Stage Censorship ===
By the early 1930s, the American Civil Liberties Union (ACLU) saw a rising tide of censorship in the theatre from external sources (such as ministers and politicians) as well as from internal sources such as (Actors' Equity which had self-imposed restrictions on expression and suggested that the Dramatists Guild of America do the same). To combat this, the ACLU created the Committee Against Stage Censorship in 1931. Helen Arthur joined the Committee saying that she was "unequivocally opposed to censorship." She went as far as accusing both the Dramatists Guild and Actors' Equity of engaging in a mild form of censorship by discouraging members from writing and appearing in "dirty plays."

== Death ==
Helen Arthur died of cerebral thrombosis at the Neurological Institute of New York on December 9, 1939. Her obituary stated that she had homes in New York City and Pleasantville, New York.
