= Meisner technique =

System to train actors

The Meisner technique is an approach to acting developed by American theatre practitioner Sanford Meisner.

The goal of the Meisner approach is for the actor to not focus on themselves, thoughts or feelings associated with the character, but instead concentrate on the other actors in the scene. To this end, some exercises for the Meisner technique are rooted in repetition so that the words are deemed insignificant compared to the underlying emotion. The Meisner technique is different from method acting taught by Lee Strasberg, although both developed from the early teachings of Konstantin Stanislavski.

== Components ==
Meisner training is an interdependent series of training exercises that build on one another. The more complex work supports a command of dramatic text. Students work on a series of progressively complex exercises to develop an ability to first improvise, then to access an emotional life, and finally to bring the spontaneity of improvisation and the richness of personal response to textual work. The techniques developed the behavioral strand of Stanislavski's. The technique is used to develop improvisation skills as well as "interpreting a script, and creating the specific physical characteristics of each character the actor played".

An example of a technique Meisner invented to train actors' responses is called the Repetition Exercise:

In this exercise, two actors sit across from each other and respond to each other through a repeated phrase. Initially, the phrase refers to an external physical characteristic such as "You're wearing a red shirt." As the exercise progresses, it becomes more about each other's behavior, and reflects what is going on between them in the moment, such as "You look unhappy with me right now." The way this phrase is said as it is repeated changes in meaning, tone and intensity to correspond with the behavior that each actor produces towards the other. Through this device, the actor stops thinking of what to say and do, and responds more freely and spontaneously, both physically and vocally. The exercise also eliminates line readings, since the way the actor speaks becomes coordinated with his behavioral response.

== About Meisner ==
Sanford Meisner began developing his acting technique while working with the Group Theatre alongside Lee Strasberg and Stella Adler. Over the following fifty years, he refined his approach as head of the acting program at the Neighborhood Playhouse School of the Theatre in New York City and in private instruction. Throughout his career, Meisner continually revised his methodology, discarding less effective exercises and introducing new ones aimed at addressing practical challenges in actor training.

To be an interesting actor, you must be authentic. For you to ever be authentic, you must embrace who you really are. Do you have any idea how liberating it is to not care what people think about you? Well, that's what we're here to do.

— Sanford Meisner, Meisner Technique Studio

In 1935, Sanford Meisner, one of the founding members of The Group Theatre (along with Stella Adler, Bobby Lewis, Harold Clurman, and Lee Strasberg), joined the faculty of The Neighborhood Playhouse. Over the years, he developed and refined what is now known as the Meisner Technique, a step-by-step procedure of self-investigation for the actor now globally recognized and among the foremost of modern acting techniques.

Meisner believed that the study of the actor's craft was rooted in acquiring a solid organic acting technique. It was a cornerstone of his teaching that this learning process occur not in a theoretical, abstract manner, but in the practical give and take of the classroom, where as he once said, "the students struggled to learn what I struggled to teach." Through that struggle the gifted student, over time gradually begins to emerge solidly in his or her work.

In 1980, a group of his alumni got together to preserve his teachings for future generations. Sydney Pollack directed a master class taught by Sanford Meisner. It was digitized in 2006.

Meisner set out his approach to actor training in a co-authored book that offers a fly-on-the-wall view of his teaching practice, Sanford Meisner: On Acting (1987). More recent historical research documents his early career as a classical pianist, studying at the precursor to the Juilliard School. Several sources suggest that his musical training led Meisner to emphasise listening as the guiding principle for an actor throughout Meisner Technique. A biography published in 2017 offers insight into Meisner's later life with his partner James Carville and their adopted son Boolu.

== Practitioners ==
The Neighborhood Playhouse was originally founded as an off-Broadway theatre by philanthropists Alice and Irene Lewisohn in 1915. After closing in 1927, it re-opened the following year as the Neighborhood Playhouse School of the Theatre, with the addition of Rita Wallach Morgenthau. Sanford Meisner, who was one of the founding members of the Group Theatre (along with Stella Adler, Bobby Lewis, Harold Clurman, and Lee Strasberg), joined the faculty of the Neighborhood Playhouse in 1935. Over the years, he developed and refined what is now known as the Meisner Technique. On October 18, 2018, the New York City Council officially recognized the 90th anniversary of the Neighborhood Playhouse, and Meisner's contributions to the school, with an official Proclamation.

The William Esper Studio was founded in 1965 as a school for the performing arts in Manhattan, New York. Its founder, William "Bill" Esper (1932–2019), is occasionally referred to as the best-known of Meisner's first generation teachers.

== List of Meisner-trained actors ==
Actors who have trained in the Meisner technique include:

- Alex Essoe
- Alexandra Daddario
- Amanda Setton
- Amy Schumer
- Carrie-Anne Moss
- Chad Willett
- Chadwick Boseman
- Christoph Waltz
- Christopher Meloni
- Diane Keaton
- Ed Speleers
- Grace Kelly
- Griffin Dunne
- James Gandolfini
- Jeff Kober
- Jeff Goldblum
- Joakim Nätterqvist
- Jon Voight
- Karl Urban
- Keiko Agena
- Maria Pitillo
- Mark Rydell
- Mary Steenburgen
- Michael Paré
- Michelle Meyrink
- Milo McCabe
- Naomi Watts
- Natasha Negovanlis
- Nawazuddin Siddiqui
- Néstor Carbonell
- Robert Duvall
- Sam Rockwell
- Sandra Peabody
- Sebastian Stan
- Shaun Benson
- Sophie Thatcher
- Stephen Colbert
- Sydney Pollack
- Tatiana Maslany
- Timothée Chalamet
- Tom Cruise
- Wil Wheaton

== See also ==
- List of acting techniques

== Sources ==
- Banham, Martin, ed. 1998. The Cambridge Guide to Theatre. Cambridge: Cambridge UP. ISBN 0-521-43437-8.
- Courtney, C. C. 2000. "The Neighborhood Playhouse." In Krasner (2000b, 291-295).
- Hirsch, Foster. 2000. "Actors and Acting." In Wilmeth and Bigsby (2000, 490-513).
- Hodge, Alison, ed. 2000. Twentieth Century Actor Training. London and New York: Routledge. ISBN 0-415-19452-0.
- Kraner, David. 2000a. "Strasberg, Adler and Meisner: Method Acting." In Hodge (2000, 129-150).
- ---, ed. 2000b. Method Acting Reconsidered: Theory, Practice, Future. New York: St. Martin's P. ISBN 978-0-312-22309-0.
- Longwell, Dennis, and Sanford Meisner. 1987. Sanford Meisner on Acting. New York: Random House. ISBN 978-0-394-75059-0.
- Postlewait, Thomas. 1998. "Meisner, Sanford." In Banham (1998, 719).
- Wilmeth, Don B, and Christopher Bigsby, eds. 2000. The Cambridge History of American Theatre. Vol 3. Cambridge and New York: Cambridge UP. ISBN 978-0-521-66959-7.
