= Herbert Crowley =

British painter

Herbert E. Crowley
- Born: 1873; London, United Kingdom
- Died: 11 December 1937 (aged 63–64); Ascona, Switzerland
- Notable work: The Wigglemuch
- Movement: Symbolism
- Spouse: Alice Lewisohn Crowley

Herbert E. Crowley (1873–1937) was a British artist, set designer, and comic strip cartoonist. He is the author of The Wigglemuch, a symbolic comic strip published by the New York Herald. It ran for a total of 13 installments from March to June 1910. His work was exhibited in the 1913 Armory Show.

== Life ==
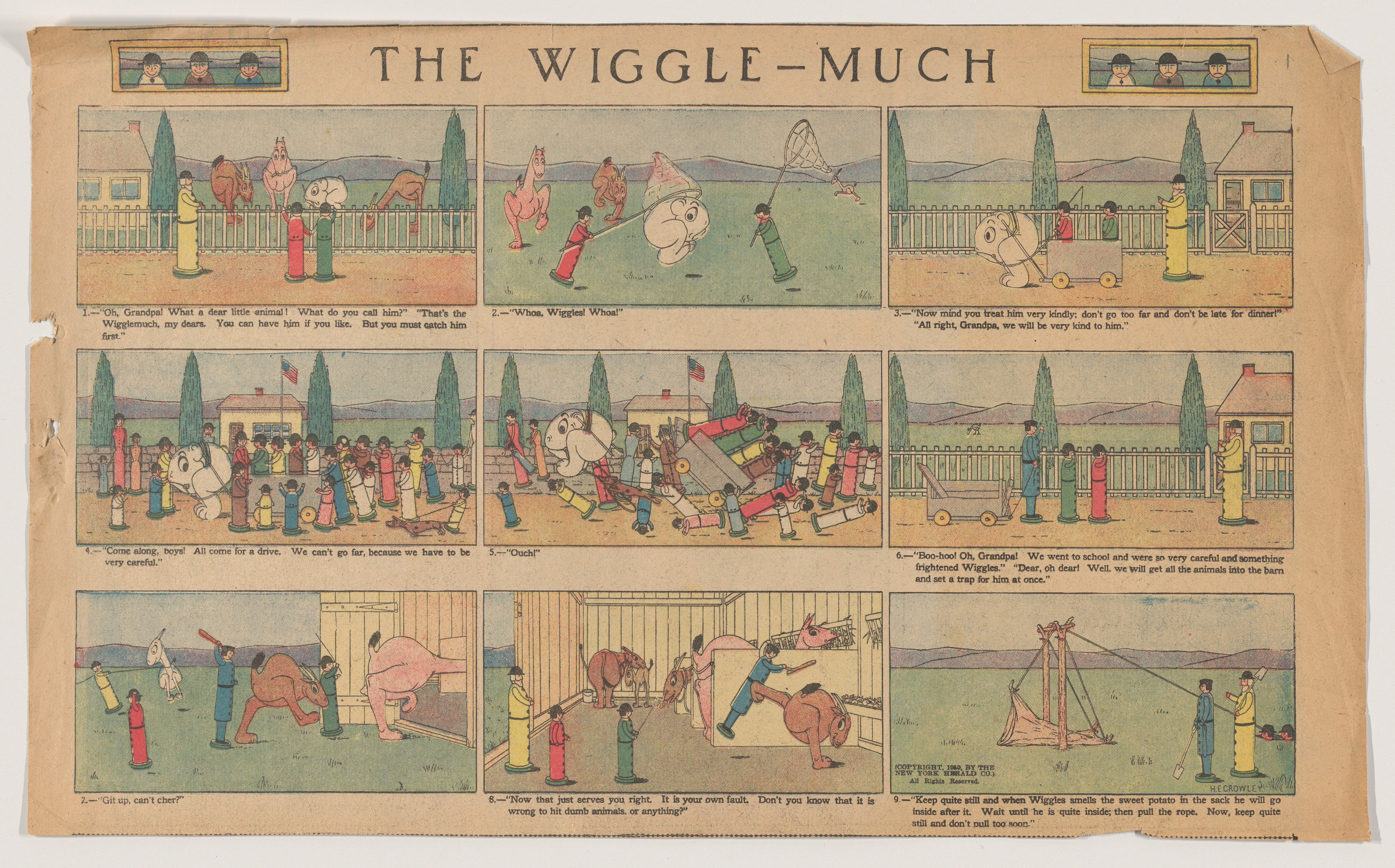
The Wiggle Much comic strip, no. 1

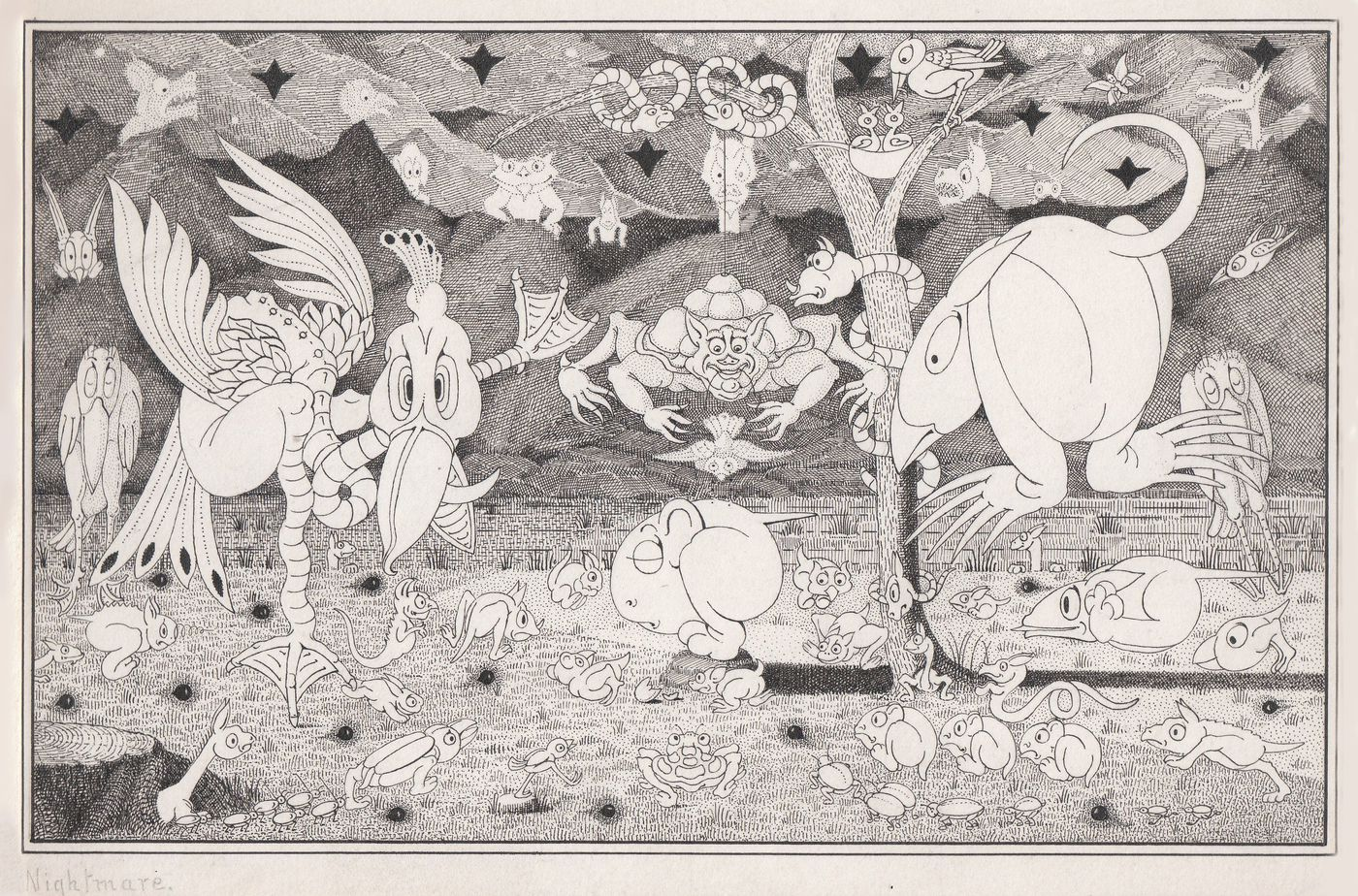
"Nightmare"

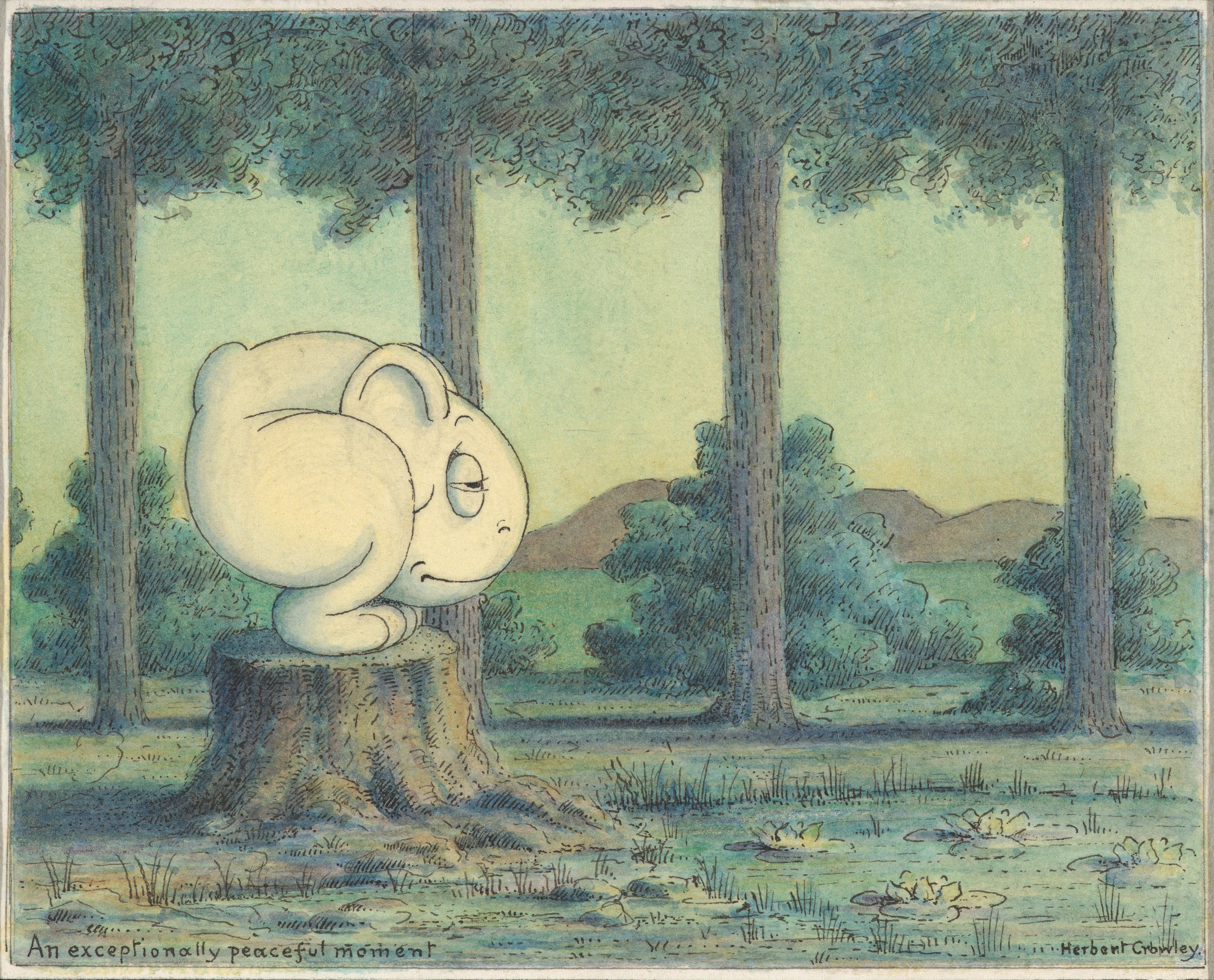
"An Exceptionally Peaceful Moment"

Born in London in 1873, Crowley grew up to become a painter. Even though he studied singing in Paris and became a trained musician, his drawings and cartoons led him to New York, where he lived for around 15 years. His first work after arriving in the US in 1910 was The Wigglemuch (published by the New York Herald), a comic strip that has become his most famous piece. It was also the only collection of comic strip cartoons that he would ever publish. Between 1910 and 1924, many of his paintings and sketches were exhibited in New York, in both collective and individual exhibitions, including the Armory Show in 1913 and frequent artwork displays on 57th Street. He exhibited with Léon Bakst at the Berlin Photographic Company in New York in 1914, where his work was compared to that of William Blake in the exhibition catalog. The New York Times, in an article about the exhibit, remarked, regarding the comparison that "what resemblances may exist between the two artists is strongest in the spiritual quality of their attitude toward their art and a kind of personal symbolism not very clear to the uninitiated."

He married Neighborhood Playhouse founder Alice Lewisohn in 1924, and the two of them became part of the Carl Jung inner circle in Zürich. Crowley was one of the first set designers for the Neighborhood Playhouse, designing sets for The Kairn of Koridwen in 1917. The New York Times mentioned the wedding, held in London in a small item on an obituaries page, identifying Crowley only as "an English artist." The item went on to mention that "... (Alice) told none of her friends of the possibility that she might be married before she returned, but they were not surprised at the news, for she and Mr. Crowley had been close friends for several years."

In the mid-to-late 1920s Crowley returned to London and spent some time traveling. He went to the Middle East and he frequently visited India. Crowley eventually established himself in Zürich, Switzerland, where he would spend the rest of his life. He died unexpectedly on 11 December 1937 in Ascona. Nowadays, some of his relatives still reside in Zürich, conserving his personal collection of sketches, paintings, writings and personal items. A cache of his artwork, designs, and news clippings are stored in the Metropolitan Museum of Art archives.

His most recent exhibit, "Two Fantastic Draftsmen: Herbert Crowley and Winsor McCay", was held at the Metropolitan Museum of Art in February/May 1966. This show was described in the exhibit catalog as "An exhibition of fifty-four drawings, watercolors, and political cartoons by the pre-World War II comic-strip artists who created "The Wigglemuch" and "Little Nemo in Slumberland."

In 2016, his works (many of which were unpublished) were collected in The Temple of Silence: Forgotten Worlds of Herbert Crowley, a crowdfunded book by Justin Duerr, published in 2019 by Beehive Books.

== Works ==
- The Wigglemuch (1910)
- Portfolio of Symbolic Drawings (1913)
