= Elizabeth Eisenstein =

American historian (1923–2016)

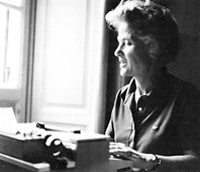
- Elizabeth Eisenstein in 1979 as the first resident scholar for the Center for the Book at the Library of Congress
- Born: October 11, 1923
- Died: January 31, 2016 (aged 92)
- Education: Vassar College; Radcliffe College
- Scientific career
- Fields: Historian
- Workplaces: University of Michigan

Elizabeth Lewisohn Eisenstein (October 11, 1923 – January 31, 2016) was an American historian of the French Revolution and early 19th-century France. She is well known for her work on the history of early printing, writing on the transition in media between the era of 'manuscript culture' and that of 'print culture', as well as the role of the printing press in effecting broad cultural change in Western civilization.

== Career ==
Eisenstein was educated at Vassar College where she received her A.B., then went on to Radcliffe College for her M.A. and Ph.D. It was there she studied under Crane Brinton. She reported that in the early 1950s she was not able to find a position in a university history department, not even part-time work. In 1957, after she had obtained her PhD, she and her husband moved to Washington, D.C. where she applied to multiple institutions for teaching positions, including Georgetown, George Washington University, Howard, and the University of Maryland. She eventually found a part-time position at American University.

She taught as an adjunct professor at American University from 1959 to 1974, then the University of Michigan, where she was the Alice Freeman Palmer Professor of History. In 1979 she was resident consultant for the Center for the Book at the Library of Congress.

She held positions as a fellow at the Humanities Research Center of the Australian National University and at the Center for Advanced Study in the Behavioral Sciences (Palo Alto). Eisenstein was visiting professor at Wolfson College, Oxford, and published her lectures from that period as Grub Street Abroad. She was professor emerita at the University of Michigan and an honorary fellow of St Cross College, Oxford.

Her last work was Divine Art, Infernal Machine, the Reception of Printing in the West (Penn Press, 2011).

== Family and personal life ==
Eisenstein is the third daughter of Sam A. Lewisohn, son of Adolph Lewisohn and Margaret Seligman, granddaughter of Joseph Seligman and Babet Steinhardt.

She married Julian Calvert Eisenstein in 1948. They had 4 children - one who died at birth in 1949 and another who died suddenly from a cerebral hemorrhage in 1974. Her husband died three months after her death. They were survived by two children, three grandchildren and two great-grandchildren.

From the age of 50, Eisenstein began competing in senior tennis tournaments, becoming well-known and winning three national grand slams between 2003-2005.

== The Printing Press as an Agent of Change ==
Eisenstein describes the conditions of scarcity that characterized the book as artifact in the age of the scribe.

Eisenstein's best-known work is The Printing Press as an Agent of Change (1980), a two-volume, 750-page exploration of the effects of movable type printing on the literate elite of post-Gutenberg Western Europe. In this work she focuses on the printing press's functions of dissemination, standardization, and preservation and the way these functions aided the progress of the Protestant Reformation, the Renaissance, and the Scientific Revolution. Eisenstein's work brought historical method, rigor, and clarity to earlier ideas of Marshall McLuhan and others, about the general social effects of such media transitions.

This work provoked debate in the academic community from the moment it was published and is still inspiring conversation and new research today. Her work also influenced later thinking about the subsequent development of digital media. Her work on the transition from manuscript to print influenced thought about new transitions of print text to digital formats, including multimedia and new ideas about the definition of text.

Eisenstein’s book has also received sharp criticism. Paul Needham, now Librarian at Princeton University’s Scheide Library, described it as "almost impossible to comprehend" and suffering "from more general flaws of historical method: an unconcern for exact chronology; a lack of historical context; an exclusive reliance of [sic] secondary writings, not always accurately absorbed, not always particularly relevant …"

== The Printing Revolution in Early Modern Europe ==
Eisensten's literary work The Printing Revolution in Early Modern Europe is guided by the question of what the effects of printing were on written records and on the views of already literate elites. She becomes concerned with how printing altered written communications within a commonwealth of learning. She explains that she writes primarily to address misconceptions found in Western European historians, such as focusing on the shift from oral folk culture to a print-made one. Eisenstein argues that there is a danger in her profession that involves recal more than the common assumption of oblivion. She identifies the work of the printing press as an agent of change in Western Europe but not the agent—a distinction that she marks as important in avoiding monocausal interpretation or reductionism.

=== The Unacknowledged Revolution ===
The Printing Press as an Agent of Change lays out Eisenstein's thoughts on the "Unacknowledged Revolution," her name for the revolution that occurred after the invention of print. Print media allowed the general public to have access to books and knowledge that had not been available to them before; this led to the growth of public knowledge and individual thought. The ability to formulate thought on one's own thoughts became reality with the popularity of the printing press. Print also "standardized and preserved knowledge which had been much more fluid in the age of oral manuscript circulation" Eisenstein recognizes this period of time to be very important in the development of human culture; however, she feels that it is often overlooked, thus, the 'unacknowledged revolution'.

The Printing Revolution in Early Modern Europe

Eisensten's work, esepecially her second edition, is guided by the question of what the effects of printing were on written records and on the views of already literate elites. She becomes concerned with how printing altered written communications within a commonwealth of learning. She explains that she writes primarily to address misconceptions found in Western European historians, such as focusing on the shift from oral folk culture to a print-made one. Eisenstein argues that there is a danger in her profession that involves recal more than the common assumption of oblivion. She identifies the work of the printing press as an agent of change in Western Europe but not the agent—a distinction that she marks as important in avoiding monocausal interpretation or reductionism.

=== Eisenstein-Johns Debate ===
In 2002, Eisenstein was involved in a debate with Adrian Johns in the American Historical Review over the degree to which printing was necessarily an agent of change or, as Johns argued, a vehicle of change which mostly carried messages that were shaped by outside social forces.

== Awards ==
Eisenstein has received various awards and recognitions, including fellowships from the John Simon Guggenheim Memorial Foundation, the National Endowment for the Humanities, and the Rockefeller Foundation. In 2002, she received the American Historical Association's Award for Scholarly Distinction, and in 2004 the University of Michigan awarded her the honorary degree of Doctor of Humane Letters.

She gave the A.S.W. Rosenbach Lectures in Bibliography in 2010: "Divine Art / Infernal Machine: Western Views of Printing Surveyed."

In 2012 she was awarded the Gutenberg Prize of the International Gutenberg Society and the City of Mainz

In 1993, the National Coalition of Independent Scholars created the Eisenstein Prize, which is awarded biannually to members of the organization who have produced work with an independent focus.

== Selected bibliography ==
- Divine Art, Infernal Machine, The Reception of Printing in the West. Philadelphia PA: University of Pennsylvania Press. 2011. ISBN 978-0-8122-4280-5. Based on the Rosenbach lectures, March 2010.
- The printing revolution in early modern Europe (2nd ed.). Cambridge UK: Cambridge University Press. 2005. ISBN 0-521-84543-2. Includes a new afterword by the author.
- Grub Street abroad : aspects of the French cosmopolitan press from the age of Louis XIV to the French Revolution. Oxford: Clarendon Press. 1992. ISBN 0-19-812259-4. Series : Lyell lectures 1990-1991.
- Print culture and enlightenment thought. [Chapel Hill]: Hanes Foundation, Rare Book Collection/University Library, University of North Carolina at Chapel Hill. 1986. Series : The Sixth Hanes lecture.
- The printing revolution in early modern Europe (abridged edition of The printing press as an agent of change ed.). Cambridge UK: Cambridge University Press. 1983. ISBN 0-521-25858-8.
- The printing press as an agent of change: communications and cultural transformations in early modern Europe (2 vols. ed.). Cambridge UK: Cambridge University Press. 1979. ISBN 0-521-22044-0.
- "Some Conjectures about the Impact of Printing on Western Society and Thought: A Preliminary Report," The Journal of Modern History Vol. 40, No. 1, March 1968
- The First Professional Revolutionist : Filippo Michele Buonarroti. Cambridge, MA: Harvard University Press. 1959. ISBN 978-0-674-30400-0.

== See also ==
- History of the book
