= Sound of Tears =

2014 Cameroonian film

- Directed by: Dorothy A. Atabong
- Written by: Dorothy A. Atabong
- Starring: Dorothy Atabong, Edsson Morales, Eugene Paul, Rhoma Spencer, Edgar Fraser, Albert Williams, Aisha Betham
- Release date: 2014
- Country: Canada

Sound of Tears is a 2014 Canadian movie directed and written by the Cameroonian director Dorothy A. Atabong.

== Plot ==
Amina and her family have left the city running away from her estranged lover, Josh, but he manages to track them down.

== Awards ==
Sound of Tears won the award for Best Diaspora Short film at the 11th Africa Movie Academy Awards in 2015. The film was selected by the Écrans Noirs Festival in 2016, and won awards at the 2018 International Images Film Festival for Women (IIFF).

== Cast ==
- Dorothy Atabong
- Edsson Morales
- Eugene Paul
- Rhoma Spencer
- Edgar Fraser
- Albert Williams
- Aisha Betham
