= Adele Lewisohn Lehman =

American philanthropist

- Born: Adele Lewisohn; May 17, 1882; New York City, US
- Died: August 31, 1965 (aged 83); Purchase, New York, US
- Education: Barnard College
- Spouse: Arthur Lehman
- Children: Dorothy Lehman Bernhard; Frances Lehman Loeb; Helen Lehman Buttenwieser
- Parent(s): Emma Cahn Lewisohn; Adolph Lewisohn
- Relatives: Sam A. Lewisohn (brother); Leonard Lewisohn (uncle); Jesse Lewisohn (cousin); Lillie Lewisohn Vogel (cousin); Alice Lewisohn (cousin); Irene Lewisohn (cousin); Robert A. Bernhard (grandson); Mayer Lehman (father-in-law)

Adele Lewisohn Lehman (May 17, 1882 – August 11, 1965) was an American philanthropist and member of the Lehman family.

== Biography ==
Adele Lewisohn Lehman was born to a Jewish family on May 17, 1882, in New York City, the daughter of Emma (née Cahn) and Adolph Lewisohn.

Her father and his brothers (Julius and Leonard) were known as "copper kings" after making their fortune opening copper mines to fuel demand for copper wire with the advent of electricity; her father was also a leader in prison reform.

Lehman attended the Anne Brown School and then Barnard College, where she was a member of the class of 1903.

== Philanthropy ==
Coming from wealth and marrying into wealth, Lehman was a prominent philanthropist. Although Lehman was an honorary chairperson for the Federation of Jewish Philanthropies (founded by her husband Arthur Lehman), most of her philanthropic efforts were secular. She was a board member of the New York Service for the Orthopedically Handicapped; was both a founder and board member of the Arthur Lehman Counseling Service; served as the president of the East Side Free School for Crippled Children; the Purple Box, an outlet for the sale of goods made by disabled women; served as director of the Adoption Bureau; was a board member of the New York Board of Charities; a member of the Crusade for Children (part of the Child Welfare League of America); served as vice president of the League of Women Voters until 1945; and served on the board of directors for the Philharmonic Symphony Society of New York (elected 1947); and was a board member of the Hebrew Sheltering Guardian Society. In 1957, the Adele Lehman Hall at Barnard College was named in her honor; the hall held the Wollman Library until 2015.

== Personal life ==
On November 25, 1901, she married banker Arthur Lehman (1873–1936), son of Babette (née Newgass) and Mayer Lehman. Arthur belonged to the prominent Lehman family: his father was a co-founder of Lehman Brothers; brother Herbert H. Lehman, was a former governor and senator of New York; another brother, Irving Lehman, was a former judge of the New York state court of appeals. Together they had three daughters: Dorothy Lehman Bernhard (1904–1969), Helen Lehman Buttenwieser (1905–1989), and Frances Lehman Loeb (1906–1996). Lehman died of a cerebral hemorrhage on August 11, 1965, at her home in Purchase, New York. Lehman belonged to Temple Emanu-El in Manhattan. All of the families marrying each daughter of Adele and Arthur Lehman (the Bernhards, the Buttenweisers, and the Loebs) were as well, members of famed Temple Emanu-El. She was also a championship tennis player havong won thirty-eight competitions.

Lehman and her husband collected paintings, decorative arts, bronzes, ceramics, and tapestries from the 14th to 20th centuries. Their collection consisted of Italian primitives, and works by Henry Raeburn, Jean Baptiste Greuze, Francesco Guardi, Corneille de Lyon, Claude Lorrain, Gustave Courbet, Jan van Goyen, Aert van der Neer, Aelbert Cuyp, Jacob Isaacksz van Ruisdael, and Thomas Lawrence. After the death of her husband, she continued to expand her collection purchasing works by Van Gogh, Rousseau, Paul Gauguin, Renoir, Eugène Boudin, Odilon Redon, Georges Seurat, Paul Signac, Édouard Vuillard, Matisse, Derain, Whistler, Childe Hassam, and Degas. Upon her death, she left much of her collection to the Metropolitan Museum of Art and the Fogg Museum.
