= Tom Stewart (actor) =

English actor (born c.1988)

Tom Byam Shaw
- Born: c. 1988
- Occupation: Actor
- Years active: 2006-present

Tom Byam Shaw (also known as Tom Purbeck, Tag Stewart, and Tom Stewart) is an English actor. The son of producer Matthew Byam Shaw and actor Melanie Thaw, and grandson of actor Sheila Hancock, Byam Shaw studied acting at The Neighborhood Playhouse School of the Theatre in New York City.

== Career ==
Stewart won his role in A Room with a View within minutes of auditioning, while on his gap year before university. The casting directors have called him "a real star in the making."

=== Select filmography ===
Year	Title	Role	Notes
2007	The Bill	Tom Ryan	Episode 480; First aired 8 February 2007
2007	A Room with a View	Freddy Honeychurch	First aired 4 November 2007
