= Alice Lewisohn =

American actress and drama school owner

Alice Lewisohn Crowley
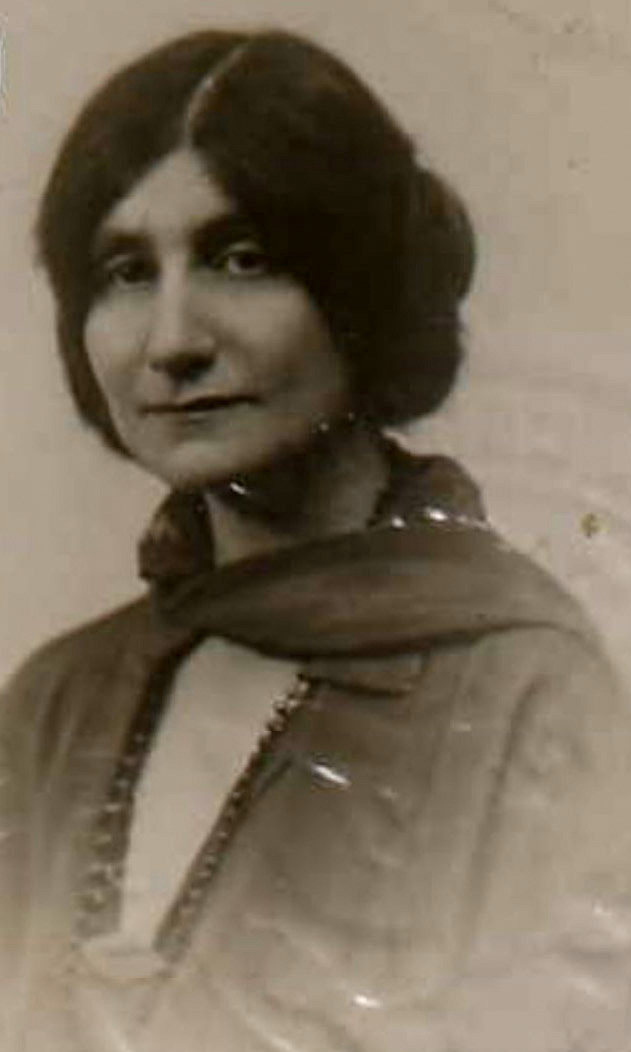
- 1922 passport photo
- Born: 1883; Manhattan, New York City, U.S.
- Died: 1972 (aged 88–89); Zurich, Switzerland
- Spouse: Herbert E. Crowley
- Parent: Leonard Lewisohn
- Relatives: Jesse Lewisohn (brother); Lillie Lewisohn Vogel (sister); Irene Lewisohn (sister); Adolph Lewisohn (uncle); Adele Lewisohn Lehman (cousin); Sam A. Lewisohn (cousin)

Alice Lewisohn (1883–1972) was the founder of the Neighborhood Playhouse with her sister Irene Lewisohn. Alice was also an actress.

== Biography ==
She was the daughter of Rosalie Jacobs and Leonard Lewisohn. In 1905 she and her sister, Irene Lewisohn, began classes and club work at the Henry Street Settlement House in New York. They produced performances with both dance and drama. In 1915, they opened the Neighborhood Playhouse on the corner of Grand and Pitt Streets. There they offered training in both dance and drama to children and teenagers. Irene was in charge of the dance training and production, with the assistance of Blanche Talmud. Alice Lewisohn was in charge of the dramatic arts. In 1924 she married artist, cartoonist and designer Herbert E. Crowley. Her father is of Jewish background.

She resided in Zurich, Switzerland for many years and was part of the Carl Jung inner circle, along with Crowley. The notion of a hermaphroditic God, drawn from Kabbalah, was suggested to Jung by Alice Lewisohn, and commented on by Jung in a dream analysis seminar.

In 1927 Lewisohn closed the Neighborhood Playhouse after a dozen years of success, including landmark productions such as 1925's The Dybbuk.

After the First World War, Lewisohn settled in Zurich with her husband. She died in Zurich 1972 as Alice Lewisohn Crowley.

== Publications ==
- The Neighborhood Playhouse (1959)

== Broadway ==
- Gertrude Kingston and a Visiting Company - The Queen's Enemies, performer: Alice Lewisohn as The Queen (1916)
- Back to Methuselah, Part II (The Gospel of the Brothers Barnabas), staged by Alice Lewisohn (1922)
- The Dybbuk, staged in association with Alice Lewisohn (1925–1926)
- Pinwheel, directed by Alice Lewisohn (1927)
