= A Room with a View (2007 film) =

2007 drama television film

- DVD cover
- Genre: Drama
- Based on: A Room with a View by E. M. Forster
- Screenplay by: Andrew Davies
- Directed by: Nicholas Renton
- Starring: Elaine Cassidy; Rafe Spall; Laurence Fox; Sophie Thompson; Elizabeth McGovern
- Music by: Gabriel Yared
- Country of origin: United Kingdom
- Original language: English

Production
- Producers: Eileen Quinn; Dave Edwards
- Cinematography: Alan Almond
- Editor: Kevin Lester
- Running time: 93 minutes
- Production companies: IWC Media; Ingenious Broadcasting; WGBH

Original release
- Network: ITV
- Release: 4 November 2007

A Room with a View is a 2007 British drama television film directed by Nicholas Renton and written by Andrew Davies, based on E. M. Forster's 1908 novel of the same name. It was announced in 2006 and filmed in the summer of 2007. A Room with a View was broadcast on 4 November 2007, on ITV.

Laura Mackie, ITV director of drama, has said that this adaptation "captures the spirit of Forster’s most memorable novel, but delivers it in a fresh, engaging way for a modern audience."

It was the first time real-life father and son Timothy and Rafe Spall had acted together.

== Plot ==
A Room With a View tells the story of Lucy Honeychurch, a young Englishwoman who visits Italy in 1907 with her cousin, Charlotte Bartlett. While in Florence, they meet a host of interesting characters, including the novelist Eleanor Lavish, the tourist Mr Emerson, and his son, George.

George falls in love with Lucy, but Charlotte whisks her charge away to Rome, where they meet Cecil Vyse and his mother. It is only when they return to England that Lucy meets George again; but by this time Lucy is engaged to Cecil Vyse.

While the novel ends with Lucy and George marrying and returning to "the room with the view" for their honeymoon, this adaptation includes an extended ending, with George being killed in World War I and Lucy returning in 1922 to the room in Florence.

== Cast ==
- Elaine Cassidy as Lucy Honeychurch
- Rafe Spall as George Emerson
- Laurence Fox as Cecil Vyse
- Timothy Spall as Mr Emerson, George's father
- Timothy West as Mr Eager
- Sinéad Cusack as Miss Lavish
- Elizabeth McGovern as Mrs Honeychurch
- Mark Williams as Mr Beebe
- Sophie Thompson as Charlotte Bartlett
- Tom Stewart as Freddy Honeychurch

== Production ==
Gabriel Yared composed the original thematic score for the film. The piece 'Entree en Foret' from his score for Island For Pachyderms was featured in the film as well.

== Reception ==
The New York Times criticized the ending of the film, but otherwise described the film as enlivening "what today seems like a formulaic tale, highlighting Forster's humor and giving the proceedings touches of raciness" Tara Conlan of The Guardian wrote that despite the changes made by Davies, the film "is more true to EM Forster's novel and its themes and it brings out the class issue more", and called the ending a "tear-jerker".
