= If (play) =

1921 play by Lord Dunsany

If is a play in four acts by Lord Dunsany. It premiered in the West End at the Ambassadors Theatre in London on 30 May 1921. It ran there for a 180 performances; closing on 29 October 1921. The production starred Henry Ainley as John Beal and Gladys Cooper as Miralda Clement. The play was later performed on Broadway at the Little Theatre where it opened on October 25, 1927. The production was staged by Agnes Morgan, and starred Walter Kingsford as John Beal and Margot Lester as Miralda Clement. The costumes were designed by Aline Bernstein and made by Helene Pons Studio.
