= Dorothy Lehman Bernhard =

- Born: April 22, 1903; New York City
- Died: March 6, 1969 (aged 65)
- Occupation: Philanthropist
- Children: Robert Arthur Bernhard; William Lehman Bernhard
- Parent(s): Adele Lewisohn Lehman; Arthur Lehman
- Relatives: Lehman family

Dorothy Lehman Bernhard (April 22, 1903 – March 6, 1969) was an American civic leader and philanthropist.

== Biography ==
Dorothy Lehman Bernhard was born in New York City to a secular Jewish family, the oldest child of Adele (née Lewisohn) and Arthur Lehman. She had two sisters, Helen Lehman Buttenwieser Lehman and Frances Lehman Loeb. She is the niece of New York governor Herbert Lehman and Irving Lehman, the Chief Justice of the Court of Appeals in New York State. Her grandfathers were Mayer Lehman and Adolph Lewisohn. In 1920, she graduated from the Horace Mann School after which she attended Wellesley College but left after one year to marry investment banker Richard Jaques Bernhard in 1923. In the 1930s, her family established a charitable fund to aid relatives in emigrating from Nazi Germany and providing assistance in their resettlement; Bernard managed the fund.

Thereafter, she dedicated herself to charitable causes. She was involved with the Child Welfare League of America for much of her life serving as vice president for 13 years and president from 1957 to 1962. She served on the board of the Citizen's Committee for Children of New York City for twenty years. Being a foster parent, she was a proponent of the deinstitutionalization of foster care. She served as chairwoman of the Hunter College School of Social Work Advisory Committee. She was appointed to the contributions New York State Board of Social Welfare from 1942 to 1947 and in 1960, she was appointed to the New York City Advisory Board on Public Welfare by Mayor Robert F. Wagner. She was also a strong supporter of Jewish organizations serving as a trustee of the Federation of Jewish Philanthropies, as vice president of the Jewish Child Care Association from 1940 to 1942, as a board member of the New York Association for New Americans, as an honorary vice president of the Associated YWHA of Greater New York, and as a member of the publications committee of Commentary magazine.

In 1962, she was presented by Eleanor Roosevelt, the first Child Welfare Award from the Child Welfare League of America. Bernhard was also an avid art collector, supporter of the Metropolitan Museum of Art, and served on the board of the New York Philharmonic.

== Personal life ==
She had two children with Richard Jaques Bernhard: Robert Arthur Bernhard (1928–2019) and William Lehman Bernhard (1931-2026). Her husband was an investment banker at Wertheim & Co. Her son William married Catherine Cahill, daughter of attorney John T. Cahill and Grace Pickens who was one of the Pickens Sisters, a trio born on a Georgia plantation that reached national stardom in the 1930s with its own radio show, concert tours and records. She was a member of Temple Emanu-El in Manhattan. She died of cancer on March 6, 1969.
