= Irene Lewisohn =

American philanthropist

- Born: September 5, 1886; New York City
- Died: April 4, 1944 (aged 57); New York City
- Known for: Neighborhood Playhouse; Museum of Costume Art
- Parent: Leonard Lewisohn
- Relatives: Jesse Lewisohn (brother); Lillie Lewisohn Vogel (sister); Alice Lewisohn (sister); Adolph Lewisohn (uncle); Adele Lewisohn Lehman (cousin); Sam A. Lewisohn (cousin)

Irene Lewisohn (September 5, 1886 – April 4, 1944) was the founder of the Neighborhood Playhouse and the Museum of Costume Art.

== Biography ==
She was the daughter of Rosalie Jacobs and Leonard Lewisohn. Her father was of Jewish background. In 1905 she and her sister, Alice Lewisohn, began classes and club work at the Henry Street Settlement House in New York. They produced performances with both dance and drama. In 1915, they opened the Neighborhood Playhouse on the corner of Grand and Pitt Streets. There they offered training in both dance and drama to children and teenagers. Irene was in charge of the dance training and production, with the assistance of Blanche Talmud. Alice Lewisohn was in charge of the dramatic arts. In 1928 they opened The Neighborhood Playhouse School of the Theatre at 16 West Forty-sixth Street. Irene Lewisohn died in 1944.

== Legacy ==
- The Irene Lewisohn Costume Reference Library is at the Metropolitan Museum of Art (the Met). Initially its goal was to provide materials to theater and film designers and to people involved in dress-related trades such as glove-makers, milliners, jewelers, and shoemakers. It also hosted lectures and exhibitions. After beginning as an independent institution, the Costume Institute merged with the Met in 1946, By 2019 it had acquired more than 33,000 garments and accessories, making it the largest costume collection in the world. By this time the Costume Institute library had more than 30,000 books and periodicals and 1,500 designer files, along with materials such as fashion plates, lookbooks, catalogs, photographs, scrapbooks, sketch collections, and textile samples, with an increasing number of users accessing these materials digitally through social media platforms such as Instagram.
