= Robert A. Bernhard =

American banker (1928–2019)

- Born: Robert Arthur Bernhard; March 14, 1928; New York City
- Died: July 4, 2019 (aged 91); Greenwich, Connecticut, U.S.
- Education: Williams College (BA/BS); Harvard University (MBA)
- Title: Former Partner of Lehman Brothers and Salomon Brothers
- Board member of: Montefiore Medical Center, Congregation Emanu-El of New York, Lincoln Center Institute, Albert Einstein College of Medicine, Metropolitan Museum of Art, Cooper Union
- Spouses: Frances Wells; Joan Mack Sommerfield
- Children: 4
- Parent(s): Richard Jaques Bernhard; Dorothy Lehman Bernhard
- Family: Adele Lewisohn Lehman (grandmother)

Robert Arthur Bernhard (March 14, 1928 – July 4, 2019) was an American banker best known as the last Lehman Brothers descendant to serve as partner of the firm.

== Life and career ==
Bernhard was born in 1928 to a Jewish family in New York City, the son of Richard Jaques Bernhard and Dorothy Lehman Bernhard. He graduated from Williams College in 1951 and the Harvard School of Business in 1953.

Bernhard joined Lehman Brothers in 1953, and became General Partner in 1962. At Lehman Brothers, Bernhard was Head of Investment Management Division and served on the Boards of the Lehman Corporation and the One William Street Fund. Bernhard left Lehman Brothers in 1972, becoming a partner at Salomon Brothers in 1974 until its merger with Phibro in 1981.

In 1981, he opened his own firm, Bernhard & Associates. In 1990 it merged with Orson Munn & Company to create Munn, Bernhard & Associates (MB Investment Partners). In 1997 he became a partner of McFarland Dewey & Company.

Bernhard is a Life Trustee of Temple Emanu-El in Manhattan, New York City, after having previously served as its president. He also serves on the boards of the Montefiore Medical Center and its Albert Einstein College of Medicine and is a Trustee of the Lincoln Center Institute. He was a Director of Medscape LLC and, from 1993 to 2011, of Stone Energy Corporation.

=== Cooper Union ===
Bernhard was chairman of the board of The Cooper Union for the Advancement of Science and Art from 1995 to 2004 and served on the board of trustees from 1975 until 2016. He was responsible for choosing George Campbell Jr. as successor to John Jay Iselin as president of the school. His service also coincided with the Cooper Union financial crisis and tuition protests.

A friend of Jerry Speyer, Bernhard was involved in the Tishman Speyer bid to take over management of the Chrysler Building, the land under which is Cooper Union's biggest asset, by agreeing to Tishman's proposal for a new lease for the building.

== Personal life ==
In 1949, he married Frances Wells; they had 4 children: Adele, Michael, Susan, Steven. In 1970, he married Joan Mack Sommerfield. He died in Greenwich, Connecticut on July 4, 2019.
