= Dorothy A. Atabong =

Cameroonian-Canadian actor

- Ayinke
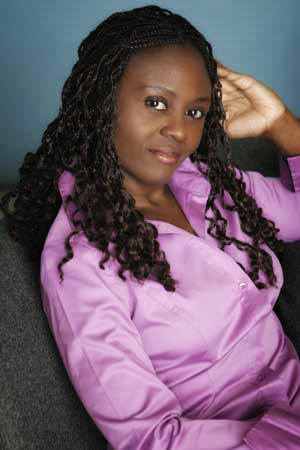
- Born: Ayinke Dorothy Atabong; Cameroon
- Other name: Dorothy Atabong Chhatwal
- Education: University of Detroit Mercy; Neighborhood Playhouse School of the Theatre, New York City
- Occupations: Actress, writer, producer
- Years active: 1999-present
- Notable work: Sound Of Tears, Mayday TV series, The Africa Trilogy
- Children: 2
- Awards: 2011 Female Eye Film Festival
- Website: Official website

Dorothy A. Atabong (née Ayinke Dorothy Atabong) is a Cameroonian-Canadian actress, writer, and producer. She is best known for Sound of Tears for which she has won various awards, including an Africa Movie Academy Award in 2015.

== Career ==
Atabong received positive reviews for theatre productions such as Wedding Band, The Africa Trilogy by Volcano Theatre, a part of Luminato Arts Festival and the Stratford Festival, The Canadian Stage Company and Studio 180 production of The Overwhelming.

Atabong published a romantic novel, The Princess of Kaya, in 2002, which she later adapted into a screenplay. Her feature-length script, Daisy’s Heart, won Best Low Budget Script at the 2011 Female Eye Film Festival in Toronto. She also wrote, produced and starred in Sound of Tears, a short film which premiered at the Montreal World Film Festival. The film won the 2015 Africa Movie Academy Award for Best Diaspora Short and also garnered a Platinum Remi at the 48th WorldFest Houston Film Festival.

TV appearances include the award-winning television series Mayday, Ocean Landing (African Hijack) for the Discovery Channel; Degrassi: The Next Generation and The Line for The Movie Network. Atabong also starred in Glo, a part of The Africa Trilogy directed by Josette Bushell-Mingo, and led a cast of 11 in the role of Julia in the acclaimed play Wedding Band by Alice Childress. Other roles include The Studio 180 and Canadian Stage Company production of The Overwhelming by J. T. Rogers, and Theatre Awakening's production of In Darfur at Theatre Passe Muraille for SummerWorks, for which she won the Emerging Artist Award.

== Personal ==
Atabong married in 2008 and has two sons, one born in 2011 the other in 2015. In 2013 Atabong appeared on the CBC Radio show Metro Morning with Matt Galloway to discuss the problem of family violence against women, and her film Sound Of Tears for the National Day of Remembrance and Action on Violence Against Women on December 6, 2013.

== Filmography and Theatre ==
=== Film ===
Year	Title	Role	Notes
2023	Christmas Casanova	Lola	
2014	Sound of Tears	Amina	Producer, writer, director
2010	Dreamt	Amanda	Co-Producer, 1st Assistant Director
2008	If Only	Mother	
2006	Nancy Loves Miss Brown	Miss Brown	Calgary International Film Festival
2006	Dollar Van	Mrs. Lebbie	
2003	Mutant Swinger from Mars	Dancer	
2002	One Night	Sawudatu	Producer, writer
2000	Impact	Hotel Receptionist	

=== Television ===
Year	Title	Role	Notes
2012	Degrassi: The Next Generation	Nurse Olivia	Episode: "Say It Ain't So"
2009	The Line	Mrs. Douglas	2 episodes
2006	Air Emergency Mayday - African Hijack	Flight Attendant	Episode: Ocean Landing
2001	NYPD Blue	Waitress	Episode: Cops and Robber

=== Theatre ===
Year	Title	Role	Notes
2010	The Overwhelming	Elise Kayitesi	The Canadian Stage Company, Toronto
2010	The Africa Trilogy	Lydia	The Fleck Dance Theatre Harbourfront, Toronto
2008	In Darfur	Hawa	Theatre Passe Muraille
2001	Joe Turner's Come and Gone	Mattie	Theatre in the Park, New York City
1999	Angelique	Manon	Detroit Repertory Theatre

== Awards ==
Year	Award	Category	Work	Result
2008	Summerworks Emerging Artist Awards	Best Actress	In Darfur	Won
2011	Female Eye Film Festival	Best Low Budget Script	Daisy's Heart	Won
2015	Africa Movie Academy Awards	Best Diaspora Short	Sound of Tears	Won
2015	WorldFest Houston Platinum Remi Awards	Best Short Film	Sound of Tears	Won
2015	Pan African Film Festival Los Angeles	Best Short Film	Sound of Tears	Nominated
2015	Yorkton Film Festival Golden Sheaf Awards	Best Director and Best Live Action Short Film	Sound of Tears	Nominated
