= If Love Were All (play) =

- Written by: Cutler Hatch (pseudonym of Agnes Morgan)
- Characters: Dr. Philip Bryce, Margaret Bryce; Janet Bryce; Frank Grayson; Alice Grayson; Ronald Grayson; George Manning; John; Emil; Fritz; A French waiter; An English tourist; A middle-aged German lad; A young French lady; A middle-aged German man; a youngish Frenchman
- Original language: English
- Genre: Comedy of manners
- Setting: New York, Paris, Vermont

Premiere
- Date premiered: November 13, 1931
- Place premiered: Booth Theatre

If Love Were All, subtitled "a gentle comedy," is a comedy in two acts and 10 scenes by Agnes Morgan under the pseudonym "Cutler Hatch." It was first produced at the Booth Theatre on Broadway by Actor-Managers, Inc. (the firm set up by Morgan and her partner Helen Arthur). Settings were created by Charles Stepanek. It is notable for being a play staged on Broadway written by a woman, and produced by women.

If Love Were All ran from November 13 through November 21, 1931. It was subsequently produced by Helen Arthur (Agnes Morgan's partner) in summer 1936 at the Casino Theatre in Newport, Rhode Island.

== Plot ==
Margaret Bryce has been happily married to Dr. Philip Bryce for many years. Dr. Bryce is a tolerant man but very devoted to his work and his patients. Even though in love with Margaret, he doesn't give enough attention to her. Janet Bryce, their child, is 18, admires her mother and is deeply devoted to her father.

During Easter vacation, Janet is home from college and discovers her mother has been seeing another man: Frank Grayson, a wealthy businessman with a wife and 19-year old son, Roland. Determined to prevent Dr. Bryce from finding out, Janet meets with Roland at the end of the school year in June and convinces him of the affair. Roland reveals that his mother is an invalid, and that knowledge of her husband's extra-marital affair would kill her. The two college-age children recognize that their generation has the understanding of how love can happen and the ability to accept it with tolerance. Janet is particularly sensitive, having just come out of a relationship. They also believe their parents' generation lacks the ability to understand and deal with such things. Seeing no way to break up their respective parents' affair, they decide to let them spend the summer with each other by vacationing with the unsuspecting spouses for three months.

On the French Riviera, Janet is with her father when she encounters George Manning, the person with whom she had an unsuccessful relationship. He is now married and unhappy. Even though Janet believes she could win him back, she recognizes the unhappiness that would befall his wife.

Meanwhile in the mountains of Vermont, Margaret Bryce and Frank Grayson have been having an enjoyable vacation. After discussing divorce from their respective spouses, they agree not to do it, recognizing the unhappiness it would bring along with the disruption of their families.

In October the families are reunited. Janet and Roland have grown fond of one another but realize their plan was a failure. Margaret Bryce and Frank Grayson seem just as much in love as ever. Janet and Roland agree to invite Margaret and Frank and themselves to dinner at a restaurant to have things out and come to a resolution.

At a German restaurant on the Upper East Side of Manhattan, Janet and Roland reveal to Margaret and Frank that they know all about their extra-marital affair and plea on behalf of the absent parents. But Margaret and Frank reveal a surprise as well: Both of their spouses have known of the extra-marital affair from the start. Because of their acceptance, there had never been any deception. Janet and Roland, shamefaced, realize that their generation does not have a monopoly on understanding human relationships. The curtain falls as they drink a toast to the absent parents, recognizing the understanding that they have yet to develop.

== Roles and original Broadway cast ==
- Aline MacMahon as Margaret Bryce
- Walter Kingsford as Dr. Philip Bryce, her husband
- Margaret Sullavan as Janet Bryce, their daughter
- Hugh Buckler as Frank Grayson
- Mabel Moore as Alice Grayson, his wife
- Donald Blackwell as Ronald Grayson, their son
- Mark Loebell as George Manning
- John M. Troughton as John
- Jules Bennett as Emil, the head waiter
- Emil Hurst as Fritz, a German waiter
- Lewis McMichael as Henri, a French waiter
- George Plinge as an English tourist
- A middle-aged German lad
- Virginia Cole as a young French lady
- Joseph E. Henshaw as Herr Schwartz, a middle-aged German man
- Josephin Wehn as Frau Schwartz, his middle-aged wife
- Walter Spelvin as a youngish Frenchman

== Reception ==
Reviews of the original Broadway production found If Love Were All lacking in a clear dramatic arc. Writing in the New York Times, Brooks Atkinson found that the play's solution was too clearly worked out and that it lacked a sufficient build up. "The situation is farce; the theme appears to be tragic; the characters are cut out of pasteboard; the ideas come out of books. The result is a play accurately described by the lady in the row behind as cute." He concluded that the plot "never comes to life as a play or a tangible problem. At best it contrives to be cute."

Eugene Burr, writing in Billboard, came away with a different reaction, calling it "a thoroly [sic] delightful play." He felt the play was conveying the contrast between passionate love which tends to be brief and affectionate love that comes with marriage, and that the two can co-exist. Burr singled out Aline MacMahon's acting, "a lovely, lilting performance that caught up the audience completely in its glamorous net." Burr remarked on Margaret Sullavan's return to the Broadway stage after a stint in Hollywood, but found her southern accent annoying and her general manner too cute.

The unnamed reviewer in Variety found If Love Were All to be too mild and overlong. Observing the play is based on a generational divide, the review complained the play lacked a strong "punch" moment, suggesting correlation with the play's subtitle "a gentle comedy." Of the actors, Sullavan was the only one who was subjected to criticism, the reviewer describing her performance as needing "some toning down, being a bit flouncy and jumpy."
