= Leonard Lewisohn (philanthropist) =

American merchant and philanthropist (1847–1902)

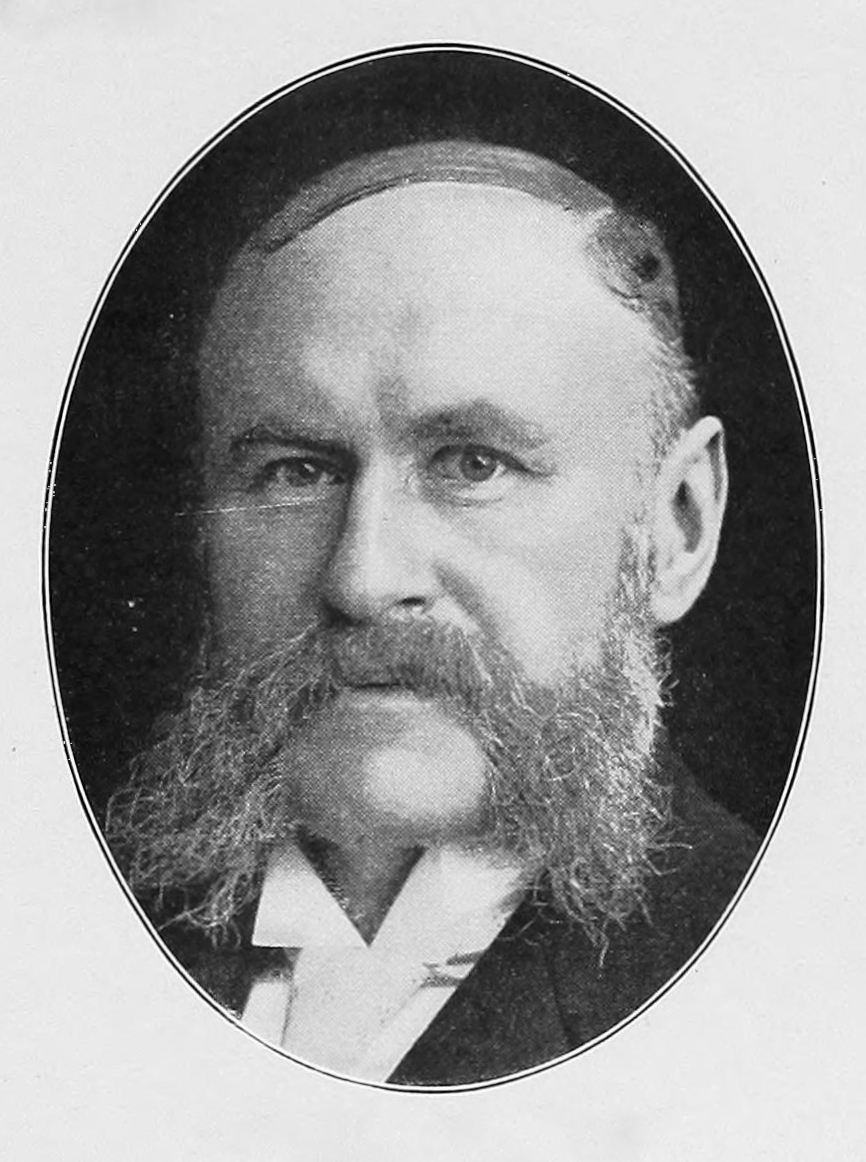
- Born: October 10, 1847; Hamburg
- Died: March 5, 1902 (aged 54); London
- Spouse: Rosalie Jacobs (1849–1900) (m. 1870)
- Children: Jesse Lewisohn (1871–1918); Julia Lewisohn (1872–1927); Samuel Lewisohn (1875–1898); Lillie Lewisohn (1876–1976); Florence (Florine) Lewisohn (1878–1903); Walter Lewisohn (1880–1938); Frederick Lewisohn (1881–1959); Alice Lewisohn (1883–1972); Aaron Oscar Lewisohn (1884–1917); Irene Lewisohn (1886–1944)
- Relatives: Adolph Lewisohn (brother); Adele Lewisohn Lehman (niece); Sam A. Lewisohn (nephew)

Leonard Lewisohn (October 10, 1847 – March 5, 1902) was an American merchant and philanthropist.

== Biography ==
He was born in Hamburg, Germany, to Jewish parents, Julie and Samuel Lewisohn. In 1863, Samuel, a prominent Hamburg merchant, sent Leonard and his brother, Julius Lewisohn, to the United States, as his firm's representatives; about three years later they were joined by their younger brother, Adolph, and they formed the firm of Lewisohn Brothers in January 1866. As early as 1868, the firm turned its attention to the metal trade, becoming prominent dealers in lead during that year. He married Rosalie Jacobs on June 29, 1870, in Manhattan. They had the following children: Jesse Lewisohn (1871–1918), Julia Lewisohn (1872–1927), Samuel Lewisohn (1875–1898), Lillie Lewisohn (1876–1976), Florence (Florine) Lewisohn (1878–1903), Walter Lewisohn (1880–1938), Frederick Lewisohn (1881-1959), Alice Lewisohn (1883–1972), Aaron Oscar Lewisohn (1884–1917), and Irene Lewisohn (1886–1944).

He was president of the United Metals Selling Company. Lewisohn was prominent in philanthropy. He contributed to the Alliance colony in New Jersey, founded in 1882, and widely to philanthropic institutions in New York, regardless of creed. He likewise acted as treasurer of the Hebrew Sheltering Guardian Society in New York City, to which institution he gave his counsel and large sums of money. He was one of the largest contributors to the Jewish Theological Seminary of America and to the Montefiore Sanatorium for consumptives.

He died on March 5, 1902, at age 54, and left an estate worth $12 million (equivalent to $450 million in 2025).
