= Divine Art, Infernal Machine =

First edition

Divine Art, Infernal Machine: The Reception of Printing in the West from First Impressions to the Sense of an Ending is a 2011 book by Elizabeth Eisenstein published by the University of Pennsylvania Press.

== Content ==
Eisenstein's work follows her analysis of the rise of printing in The Printing Press as an Agent of Change (published in 1979) by exploring the deeply ambivalent responses to the technology of printing and its revolutionary effects over the course of five centuries. Eisenstein points out that such a survey is very ambitious in scope and asserts that it fills a general absence in previous literature, and is inspired by suggestions by a figure such as Michael Warner who declared the need for a "history of the way we think about and perceive print."

At one extreme there have been notions of printing as a mephistophelean or faustian entity or a form of 'black magic' while on the other side of the spectrum there have been ideas of it as a vehicle for liberation; followers of Martin Luther in the sixteenth century, for example, saw it as a means by which people could be freed from what they perceived of as papal oppression, and in some cases saw it as a form of divine intervention. Some of the more negative ideas about printing date back to a mistaken reading of the name of a figure such as Johann Fust which was sometimes confused with Faust.

The work is structured chronologically. It begins in the early, Gutenbergian period before moving on to the post-Lutheran and post-Erasmian era, then the eighteenth-century, the zenith of printing in the nineteenth century and then on to the present day. She observes that despite the ambivalence of responses to printing, throughout the West the perspective was broadly positive rather than negative when examined in the aggregate.

Finally, Eisenstein questions the idea that the digital age will lead to the replacement of the printed book by the virtual text, drawing a parallel in chapter six with a previous debate over whether the newspaper would replace the printed book.
