= Agnes Morgan =

American director, theatrical producer and actor (1879–1976)

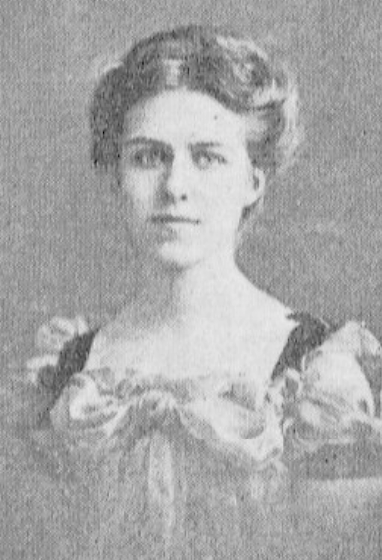
- Agnes Morgan, from the 1901 yearbook of Radcliffe College
- Born: October 31, 1879; Le Roy, New York, U.S.
- Died: May 25, 1976 (aged 96); San Bernardino, California, U.S.
- Education: Radcliffe College (BA and MA)
- Occupations: Director; playwright; actress; theatrical producer
- Partner: Helen Arthur

Agnes B. Morgan (October 31, 1879 – May 25, 1976) was a director, playwright, actress and theatrical producer. She is most known for her association with the Neighborhood Playhouse where she was a director and functioned in numerous other roles.

== Biography ==
Morgan was born in Le Roy, New York to Frank H. Morgan, an editor, and Sarah L. Cutler Morgan, a teacher. Attending Radcliffe College, she received her Bachelor of Arts degree in 1901 and her Master of Arts in 1903. In 1904 she attended George Pierce Baker's 47 Workshop at Harvard University.

She was hired at the Neighborhood Playhouse on the recommendation of one of the Playhouse teachers Sarah Cowell Le Moyne who knew Helen Arthur (who became Morgan's partner). Lewisohn described Morgan as "quiet, serious, watchful." In speaking of the Lewisohn sisters, founders of the Playhouse joining with Morgan and Helen Arthur, Lewisohn added "...never had five people cast in such different molds joined forces with more congeniality."

In speaking of two comedies, Great Catherine: Whom Glory Still Adores by Shaw and The Queen's Enemies by Lord Dunsany, Crowley recalled that "the spirited quality in both productions was largely due to Agnes Morgan's skillful direction. Perhaps Great Catherine was paving the way to her gift in handling burlesque, which was later to create an infectious vogue on Grand Street and Broadway through the [Grand Street Follies]."

Crowley described Morgan as an essential part of the Playhouse:

Agnes Morgan's apprentices were the stage crew, a neighborhood corps of assistant property boys, scene shifters, and painters But her technical facility was such that she was everywhere in the theatre, combining a collection of functions the mere mention of which would drive any "self-respecting" member of the theatre union of today into a decline. Skilled as an actor, she played an occasional role; she developed the technical side of lighting, and had an instinctive gift for direction, as for the function of stage manager. As an amateur she responded to any production need while pursuing her professional career as playwright.

Grand St. Follies: Neighborhood Playhouse had an in-house burlesque. While searching for an experimental play (promised to subscribers), Lewisohn suggested that the in-house burlesque be open to the subscribers. It had been the inspiration and creation of Agnes Morgan and Helen Arthur. The following season, staff were concerned as to whether they could equal the success of the first Grand Street Follies. "...it was clear that her genius for brilliant satire had flowered overnight.

Morgan directed thirty-one out of forty-four dramas mounted at the Neighborhood Playhouse between 1915 and its closing in 1927, as well as dance and festival shows. After the Playhouse closed she formed her own company, originally sharing the name of the annual Grand Street Follies and later called Actor-Managers, Inc. which existed until 1939. She directed eight plays on Broadway between 1927 and 1935 as well as three plays for the Federal Theatre Project. In 1931 she wrote the play If Love Were All under the pseudonym Cutler Hatch and staged it as well.

In 1940 Morgan became associate director of the Paper Mill Playhouse in Millburn, New Jersey, a position she held until 1972.

Agnes Morgan apparently met her partner, the lawyer Helen Arthur, while working at the Neighborhood Playhouse. Arthur pre-deceased Morgan on December 10, 1939.

Morgan died on May 25, 1976, in San Bernardino, California.

== Broadway stage productions ==
Information from the Internet Broadway Database.

Year	Title	Function
1913	The Man With Three Wives	co-author of book
1922	Back to Methuselah	staging for part 2
1922	R.U.R.	director
1925	The Legends of the Dance	writer, staging
1927	Lovers and Enemies	staging
1927	If	staging
1928	Maya	staging
1928	The Grand Street Follies	book, lyrics, staging
1929	Ruth Draper	stage director
1929	The Grand Street Follies	book, lyric, staging
1931	If Love Were All	writer, staging
1936	American Holiday	staging
1936	Class of '29	staging
1937	A Hero is Born	lyrics, staging
1942	Papa is All	director
1942	I Killed the Count	staging, producer

== Neighborhood Playhouse productions ==
Information from Alice Lewisohn Crowley, Neighborhood Playhouse.

Year	Title	Function
1912	The Shepherd	co-director
1915	Tethered Sheep	director
1915	The Glittering Gate	director
1915	The Maker of Dreams	co-director
1915	Captain Brassbound’s Conversion	director
1915	The Waldies	co-director (with Alice Lewisohn)
1916	The Subjection of Kezia	director
1916	A Night at an Inn	director
1916	Great Catherine	director
1916	The Inca of Perusalem	director
1916	The Queen's Enemies	co-director (with Alice Lewisohn)
1916	Black ‘Ell	co-director (with Alice Lewisohn)
1917	A Sunny Morning	co-director (with Alice Lewisohn)
1917	The People	director
1917	Pippa Passes	co-director (with Alice Lewisohn)
1918	Fortunato	co-director (with Alice Lewisohn)
1918	Free	director
1918	Guibour	director
1918	The Eternal Megalosaurus	director
1919	The Noose	director
1919	Everybody’s Husband	co-director (with Alice Lewisohn)
1920	Innocent and Annabel	director
1921	The Madras House	co-director (with Alice Lewisohn)
1922	The Suicides of the Rue Sombre	director
1922	The Grand Street Follies of 1922	co-director (with Helen Arthur)
1922	The Little Legend of the Dance	story
1923	This Fine-Pretty World	co-director (with Alice Lewisohn)
1924	The Grand Street Follies (1924)	book, lyrics; co-staged (with Helen Arthur)
1924	The Little Clay Cart	adapted, co-director (with Irene Lewisohn)
1924	Exiles	director
1925	The Critic	co-director (with Ian Maclaren)
1925	The Grand Street Follies (3rd edition)	book, lyrics
1926	The Romantic Young Lady	director
1926	The Grand Street Follies (4th edition)	book, lyrics, staging
1926	The Lion Tamer	director
1927	The Grand Street Follies (5th edition)	sketches, lyrics

== Sources ==
- Cobrin, Pamela (2009). From Winning the Vote to Directing on Broadway: The Emergence of Women on the New York Stage, 1880–1927. Newark, DE: University of Delaware Press. ISBN 978-0-87413-058-4.
- Crowley, Alice Lewisohn (1959). Neighborhood Playhouse: Leaves From a Theatre Scrapbook. New York: Theatre Arts Books.
- Harbin, Billy J.; Marra, Kim; Schanke, Robert A., eds. (2005). The Gay and Lesbian Theatrical Legacy: A Biographical Dictionary of Major Figures in American Stage History in the Pre-Stonewall Era. Ann Arbor, MI: University of Michigan Press. ISBN 978-0-472-09858-3.
- Knapp, Margaret M. (2008). American Women Stage Directors of the Twentieth Century. Urbana, IL: University of Illinois Press. pp. 666–667. ISBN 978-0-252-03226-4.

== General bibliography ==
- American Women Playwrights, 1900–1930. A checklist. Compiled by Frances Diodato Bzowski. Westport, CT: Greenwood Press, 1992.
- American Women Stage Directors of the Twentieth Century. By Anne Fliotsos and Wendy Vierow. Urbana, IL: University of Illinois Press, 2008.
- Biography Index. A cumulative index to biographical material in books and magazines. Volume 16: September, 1988-August, 1990. New York: H.W. Wilson Co., 1990.
- Biography Index. A cumulative index to biographical material in books and magazines. Volume 19: September, 1993-August, 1994. New York: H.W. Wilson Co., 1994.
- The Gay and Lesbian Theatrical Legacy. A biographical dictionary of major figures in American stage history in the pre-Stonewall era. Edited by Billy J. Harbin, Kim Marra, and Robert A. Schanke. Ann Arbor, MI: University of Michigan Press, 2005.
- Notable Women in the American Theatre. A biographical dictionary. Edited by Alice M. Robinson, Vera Mowry Roberts, and Milly S. Barranger. New York: Greenwood Press, 1989.
- Who's Who of American Women. First edition, 1958–1959. Wilmette, IL: Marquis Who's Who, 1958.
- Who's Who of American Women. Second edition, 1961–1962. Wilmette, IL: Marquis Who's Who, 1961.
- Who's Who of American Women. Third edition, 1964–1965. Wilmette, IL: Marquis Who's Who, 1963.
- Who's Who of American Women. Fourth edition, 1966–1967. Wilmette, IL: Marquis Who's Who, 1965.
- Who's Who of American Women. Fifth edition, 1968–1969. Wilmette, IL: Marquis Who's Who, 1967.
