= Marion Kirby =

American football coach

Coaching career (HC unless noted)
- 1997–2001: Greensboro

Head coaching record
- Overall: 16–32

Marion Kirby was the head football coach for Greensboro College Pride football team from 1997 to 2001. He was the program's first-ever coach and compiled an overall record of 16–32–0. Kirby served as athletic director for Guilford College until 2007. In 2000 he was inducted into the North Carolina High School Athletic Association Hall of Fame.

== Head coaching record ==
Year	Team	Overall	Conference	Standing	Bowl/playoffs	Rank^{#}
Greensboro Pride (Division III Independent) (1997–1998)
1997	Greensboro	0–9				
1998	Greensboro	3–7				
Greensboro Pride (Atlantic Central Football Conference) (1999)
1999	Greensboro	3–6				
Greensboro Pride (USA South Athletic Conference) (2000–2001)
2000	Greensboro	5–5				
2001	Greensboro	5–5				
Total:		16–32				
National championship Conference title Conference division title or championship game berth
^{#}Rankings from final Coaches Poll.
