= Mutant Swinger from Mars =

2009 film

Mutant Swinger from Mars is a 2009 comic science fiction film written, produced and directed by Michael Kallio. The film features Jack White of The White Stripes, The Raconteurs and The Dead Weather. Shot in 1998 and completed in 2009, it made its world premiere at San Diego Comic-Con on July 25, 2009. The film's Los Angeles premiere was at Screamfest 2009 on October 24, at Grauman's Mann Chinese 6 theaters.

== Plot ==
A "long lost sci-fi film" from the 1950s, finally, has been recovered. Aliens from Mars come to Earth and force a mad scientist to create a "chick magnet" to lure women, so they may take them to Mars.

== Reception ==
Film Threat said, "What is cool about Mutant Swingers From Mars is that Kallio managed to get the film out after over two decades of on and off again filming and trying to get the funds to have it released. It shows that he really believes in his film."
