= Neighborhood Playhouse School of the Theatre =

Acting school in New York City

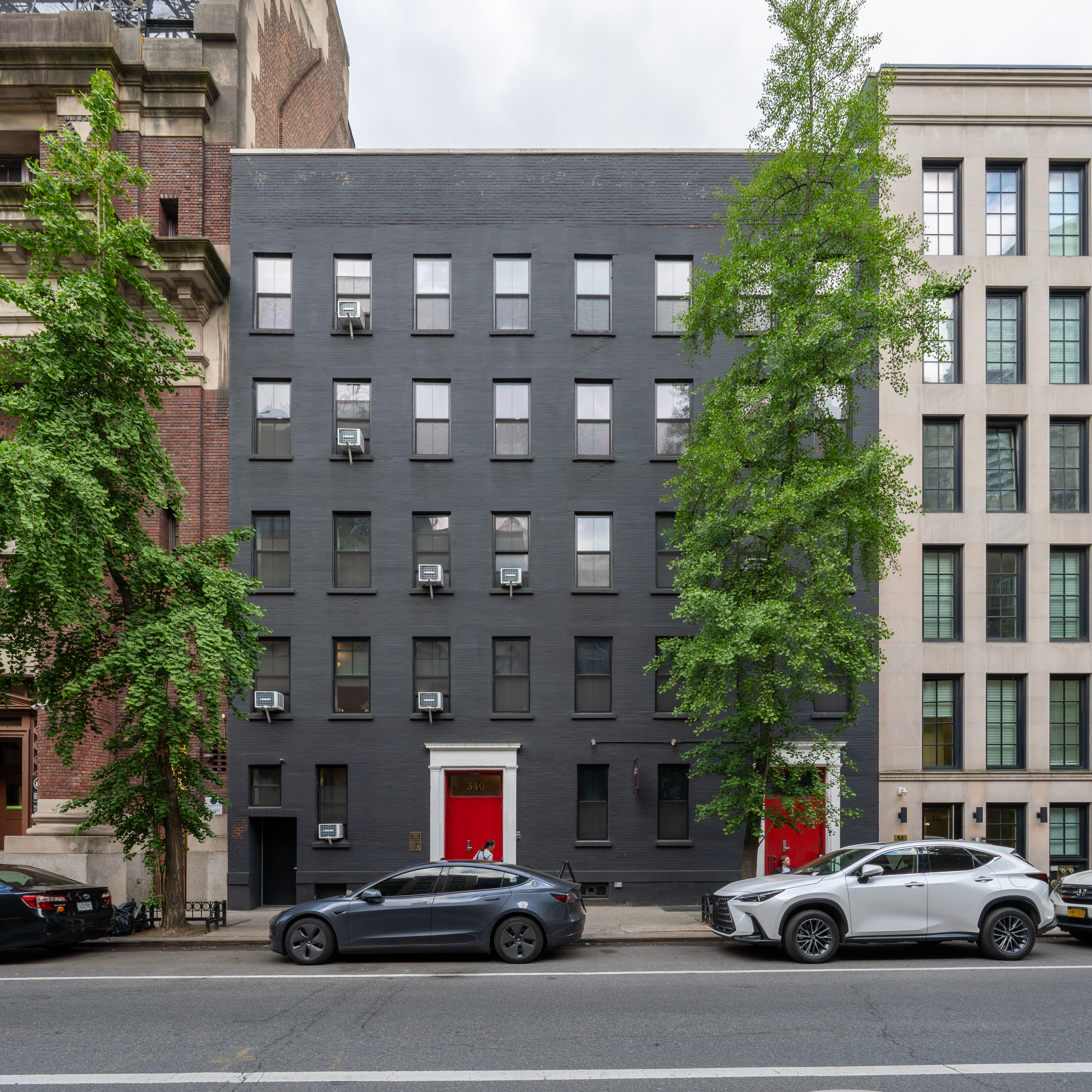
- (2026)
- Type: Drama school
- Established: 1928 (98 years ago)
- Location: 340 East 54th Street, New York City, New York, United States; 40°45′24″N 73°57′55″W
- Website: neighborhoodplayhouse.org

The Neighborhood Playhouse School of the Theatre is a professional conservatory for actors in New York City. First operational from 1915 to 1927 as the Neighborhood Playhouse, the school re-opened in 1928 under its new name, the Neighborhood Playhouse School of the Theatre, and has been active ever since. It is the birthplace of the Meisner technique of acting, named for American actor and acting teacher Sanford Meisner, who ran the school's acting department for 55 years.

== History ==
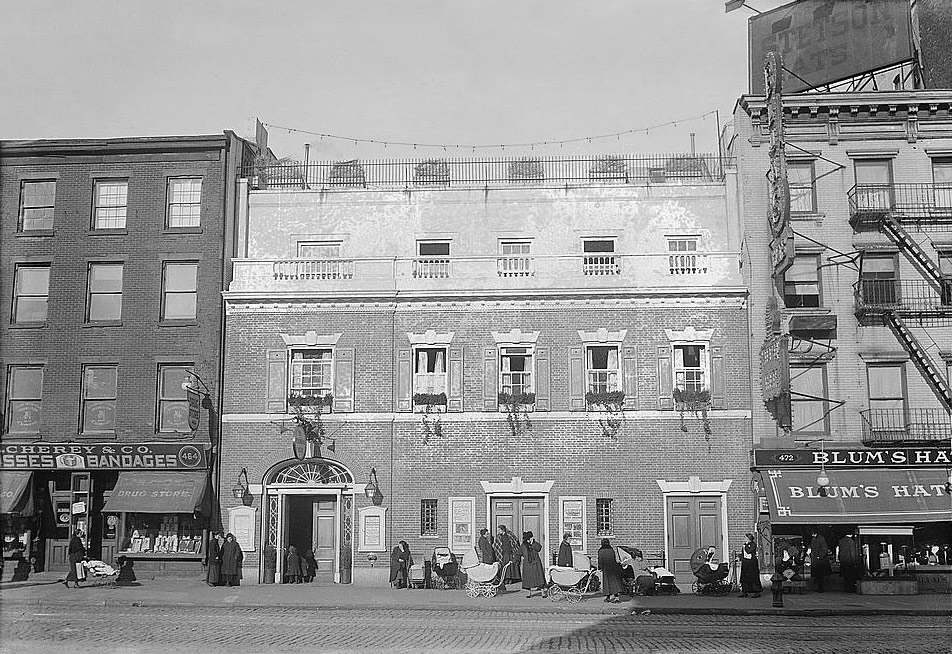
The Grand Street building in 1916

The Neighborhood Playhouse was founded as an off-Broadway theatre by philanthropists Alice Lewisohn and Irene Lewisohn in 1915. It was located on Grand St., near the Henry Street Settlement, and was the birthplace of The Grand Street Follies, an annual, satirical revue. The Grand Street building closed in 1927.

The following year, the Lewisohn sisters opened The Neighborhood Playhouse School of the Theatre on 54th St., and refocused on training rather than production. Neighborhood Playhouse joined American Academy of Dramatic Arts and Pasadena Playhouse as the only major professional training schools for the performing arts in the United States.

Sanford Meisner joined the faculty in 1935 from the Group Theatre. Meisner used his study of Russian theatre and acting innovator Konstantin Stanislavski's system to develop his own technique, an alternative to Lee Strasberg's method acting. The faculty also included Louis Horst, Agnes de Mille, and Martha Graham.

In 1937, Irene Lewisohn founded the Museum of Costume Art, which later merged with the Metropolitan Museum of Art.

In 1939, when actor Gregory Peck enrolled, there were approximately 90 students at the school.

In 1959, Alice Lewisohn Crowley published The Neighborhood Playhouse: Leaves from a Theatre Scrapbook, a collection of her memories from the Neighborhood Playhouse.

The New York City Council honored the 90th anniversary of Neighborhood Playhouse with a proclamation.

== Educational programs ==
The school offers a two-year certificate program, with admission to the second year dependent upon unanimous approval of the faculty. There is also a summer program.

The Neighborhood Playhouse offers Playhouse Juniors, a Saturday training program for children in grades 1–12.

== Notable alumni ==
=== A–F ===
- R.J. Adams
- Agnes Morgan
- Nancy Addison
- Helen Arthur
- Elizabeth Ashley
- Dorothy A. Atabong
- Ashlie Atkinson
- Barbara Baxley
- Kim Basinger
- Bill Barretta
- Carolina Bartczak
- Amanda Bearse
- Pamela Bellwood
- Pankit Thakker
- Michael Bendetti
- Ted Bessell
- Susan Blakely
- Richard Boone
- Connie Britton
- James Caan
- Matthew Carnahan
- June Carter Cash
- Carol Channing
- Leonardo Cimino
- Dabney Coleman
- Charles E. Conrad
- Nicholas Conte
- Stephanie Courtney
- Mackenzie Davis
- James Doohan
- Illeana Douglas
- Charles S. Dubin
- Keir Dullea
- Griffin Dunne
- Robert Duvall
- William Esper
- Timothy Farrell
- Mary Fickett
- Joe Flanigan
- Meg Foster
- Leonard Frey

=== G–M ===
- Edith González
- Betty Garrett
- Brian Geraghty
- Jeff Goldblum
- Jonathan Goldsmith
- Farley Granger
- Lee Grant
- Andre Gregory
- Jennifer Grey
- Tammy Grimes
- Wynn Handman
- David Hedison
- Anne Jackson
- Allison Janney
- Jasmine Cephas Jones
- Marta Kauffman
- Diane Keaton
- Grace Kelly
- Ken Kercheval
- Walter Koenig
- Peter Leeds
- Harding Lemay
- Geoffrey Lewis
- Irene Lewisohn
- Alice Lewisohn
- Christopher Lloyd
- Tina Louise
- Daniel Mann
- Kathleen Martin
- Dylan McDermott
- Darren McGavin
- Steve McQueen
- Christopher Meloni
- Peter Miller
- Les Moonves

=== N–Z ===
- Yoko Narahashi
- Leslie Nielsen
- Chris Noth
- Edmond O'Brien
- Susan Oliver
- Chris Paine
- Sandra Peabody
- Gregory Peck
- Joanna Pettet
- Suzanne Pleshette
- Amanda Plummer
- Sydney Pollack
- Antoni Porowski
- Tom Poston
- Tony Randall
- Sally Jessy Raphael
- Florence Ravenel
- James Remar
- Bert Remsen
- Burt Reynolds
- Doris Roberts
- Wayne Rogers
- Jean Rosenthal
- Kelly Rowan
- Mark Rydell
- Sherie Rene Scott
- Marian Seldes
- Patricia Smith
- Liza Snyder
- David Sobolov
- Scott Speedman
- Mary Steenburgen
- Tom Stewart
- Kenneth Tobey
- Paula Trueman
- Tom Tryon
- Brenda Vaccaro
- Jo Van Fleet
- Gloria Vanderbilt
- Eli Wallach
- Jessica Walter
- Al Waxman
- Jerry Weintraub
- Elizabeth Wilson
- Joanne Woodward
- Fei Xiang
- Otis Young
