= Sam A. Lewisohn =

American lawyer

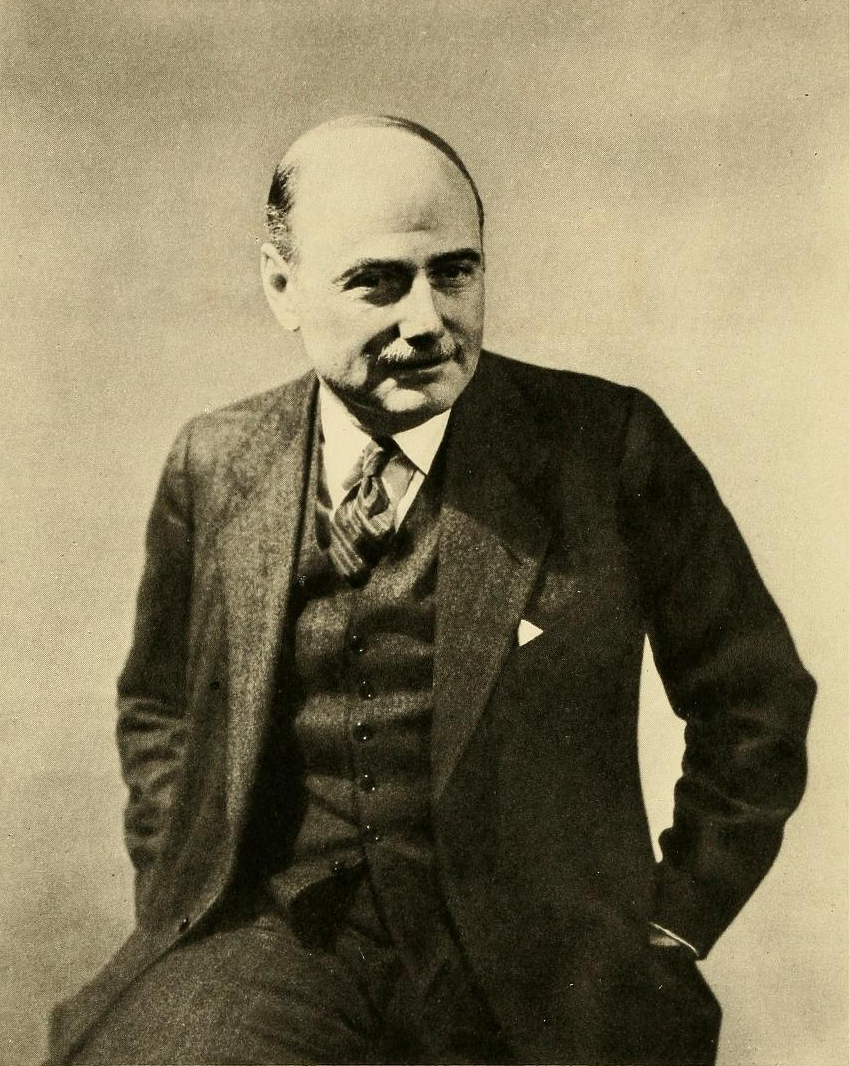
Samuel A. Lewisohn

Samuel Adolph Lewisohn (March 21, 1884 – March 13, 1951) was an American lawyer, financier, philanthropist, art collector, and non-fiction author. He is also known as first president of the American Management Association.

== Biography ==
=== Youth, education and early career ===
Lewisohn was born in New York City in 1884, the son of Adolph Lewisohn and Emma Cahn Lewisohn. After attending the Columbia Grammar & Preparatory School, he graduated from Princeton University in 1904 and from Columbia Law School in 1907. His father was of Jewish background.

After his graduation in 1907, Lewisohn started working for the New York law firm Simpson Thacher & Bartlett. In 1910 he joined his father's law firm Adolph Lewisohn & Sons, where he kept serving as lawyer. In World War I he served as District Superintendent at the Bureau of War Risk Insurance in 1918–19.

=== Later career and honors ===
Lewisohn's career as editor and nonfiction writer took off in 1907, when he had started as editor of the Columbia Law Review. He published some articles in the early 1920s, and published his first main work in 1926, entitled The New Leadership in Industry. This work was translated into French, German, and Japanese.

Lewisohn served in a number of positions in his later career. He was treasurer and Member of Executive Committee of the Citizens Union from 1918 to 1931. He was a member of the Economic Advisory Commission of President Warren G. Harding's Conference on Unemployment of 1921. In 1923 he was one of the founders of the American Management Association, and served as its first president from 1924 to 1927. He was succeeded by Frank L. Sweetser.

Lewisohn became a member of the New York Stock Exchange in 1927; Director of the Equitable Life Assurance Society of the United States, where he served as director until his death; member of the New York State Commission of Correction in 1928, and many other positions in industry, government, and culture.

=== Art collecting ===
Lewisohn was a major art collector and trustee of the Metropolitan Museum of Art. Upon his death, a number of important modern art works were donated to the Met, including works by Rousseau, Seurat, Gauguin, Renoir, Cézanne, Sterne, and Van Gogh.

=== Family and death ===
Lewisohn's father Adolph Lewisohn and his brothers, Julius and Leonard, were known as "copper kings" after making their fortune opening copper mines to meet demand for copper wire with the advent of electricity; Adolph Lewisohn was also a leader in prison reform. Lewisohn's sister Adele Lewisohn Lehman married Arthur Lehman (1873–1936), of the Lehman family.

In 1918, Lewisohn married Margaret Valentine Seligman (1895–1954), a daughter of Joseph Seligman and a "nationally known leader in education." Their third daughter was Elizabeth Eisenstein, a notable historian of the French Revolution and early 19th-century France.

Lewisohn died in 1951.

== Selected publications ==
- Lewisohn, Sam Adolph, et al. Can Business Prevent Unemployment. Knopf, 1925.
- Lewisohn, Sam Adolph. The new leadership in industry. New York: EP Dutton, 1926.
- Scott Nearing, Sam Adolph Lewisohn, Malcolm Churchill Rorty, and Morris Hillquit. The Future of Capitalism and Socialism in America. New York: League for Industrial Democracy, 1927.
- Lewisohn, Sam Adolph. Personalities Past and Present. 1939.
- Lewisohn, Sam Adolph. Human leadership in industry: the challenge of tomorrow. New York and London, 1945.
- Lewisohn, Sam Adolph. Painters and personality: a collector's view of modern art. Harper, 1948.

Articles, a selection

- Lewisohn, Sam A. "The living wage and the national income." Political Science Quarterly 38.2 (1923): 219–226.
- Lewisohn, Sam A. "New aspects of unemployment insurance." Political Science Quarterly 50.1 (1935): 1–14.
- Lewisohn, Sam A. "Mexican Murals and Diego Rivera." Parnassus 7.7 (1935): 11–12.
- Lewisohn, Sam A. "Psychology in economics." Political Science Quarterly 53.2 (1938): 233–238.
