= Adolph Lewisohn =

German Jewish immigrant

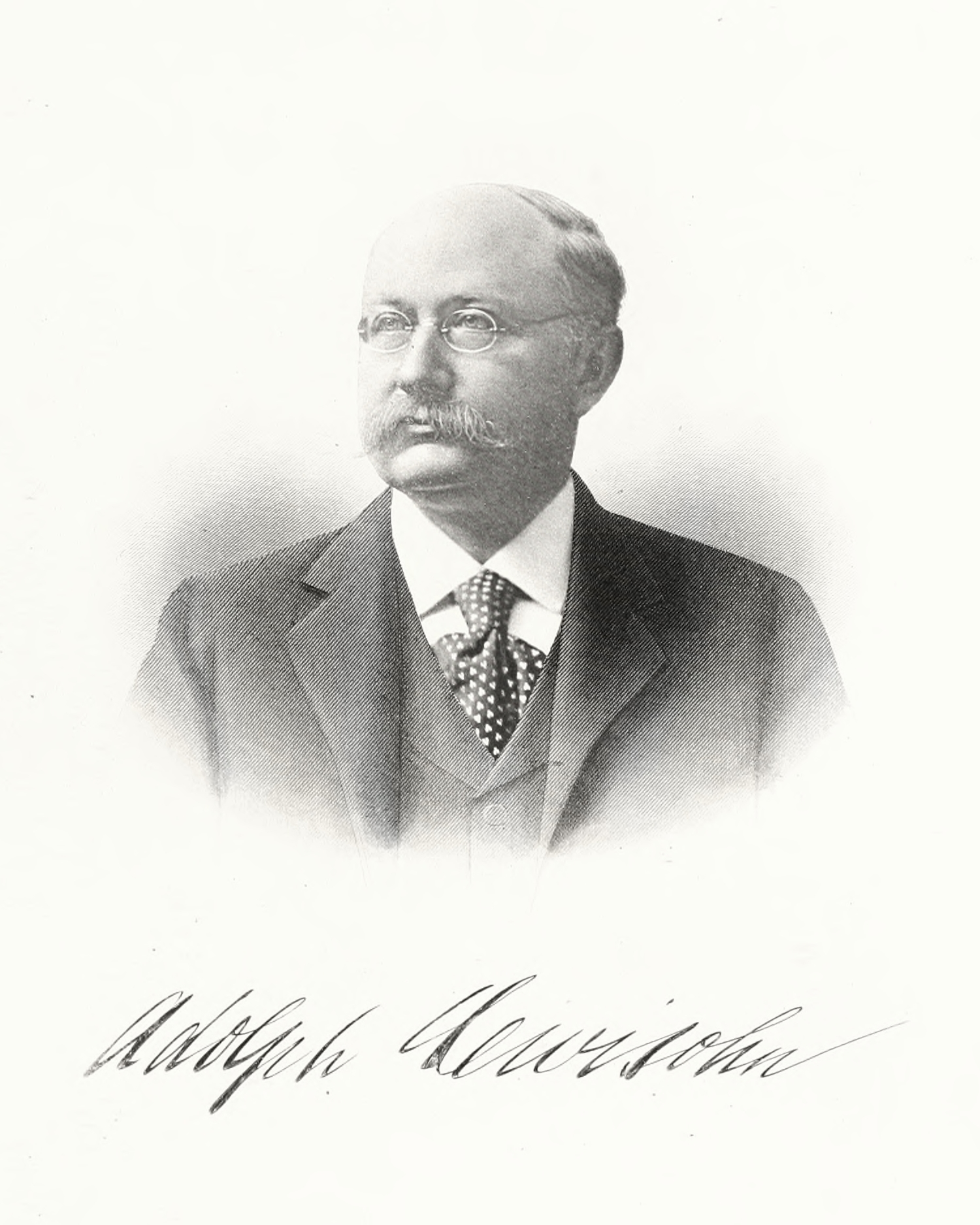
- Born: May 27, 1849; Hamburg, Kingdom of Prussia
- Died: August 17, 1938 (aged 89); Upper Saranac Lake
- Spouse: Emma Cahn (m. 1878)
- Children: Adele Lewisohn Lehman; Sam A. Lewisohn
- Relatives: Leonard Lewisohn (brother); Dorothy Lehman Bernhard (granddaughter); Helen Lehman Buttenwieser (granddaughter)

Adolph Lewisohn (May 27, 1849 – August 17, 1938) was a German Jewish immigrant born in Hamburg who became a New York City investment banker, mining magnate, and philanthropist. He is the namesake of Lewisohn Hall (which formerly housed the Columbia University School of Mines and now houses the School of General Studies and the School of Continuing Education) on the school's Morningside Heights campus, as well as the former Lewisohn Stadium at the City College of New York. In 1926 Time magazine called him "one of the most intelligent and effective workers on human relationships in the U.S."

== Early life ==
Adolph Lewisohn was a son of Samuel Lewisohn (1809–1872) and his wife Julie (died 1856). He was born in Hamburg on May 27, 1849, and grew up with two brothers and four sisters. At the age 16 Adolph emigrated to New York City to assist his brothers, Julius and Leonard Lewisohn with the family's mercantile business, Adolph Lewisohn & Son, which was named for his father. Adolph eventually became President of that business.

== Career ==
After meeting Thomas Edison in the 1870s, Adolph pushed the family firm to become involved with copper. Previously in limited demand, copper's conductivity made it vital for a world that increasingly depended on electricity. In the 1880s, the brothers were among the first to invest in the copper mines of Butte, Montana. It proved to be a profitable venture, and they later established several new mining companies; including Tennessee Copper and Chemical Corporation of Ducktown, Tennessee, General Development Company, Miami Copper Company of Miami, Arizona, and the South American Gold and Platinum Company. Subsequently, Adolph and his brothers became "copper kings" with one of their mines paying 35 million in dividends by the 1890s. It was about this time that Adolph stated he had made all the money he wanted to make, and decided to stop and enjoy it.

== Art collecting ==
Lewisohn was an avid collector of art and items of historical interest, and a deep lover of classical music; in particular opera. He collected paintings, antiquities, decorative arts, manuscripts and rare books. He was particularly known for his extensive collection of works by artists from the Barbizon school and the later Impressionist artists. He was also an amateur singer, and every year on his birthday would sing opera arias to his birthday party guests up until the end of his life.

== Philanthropy ==
Lewisohn had a firm belief that everyone should be able to experience fine art, and much his philanthropic endeavours went towards making this vision happen. He donated a significant portion of his art collection to the Brooklyn Museum of Art, including “The Awakening” by Maurice Sterne, "Selina" by Jacob Epstein, and “Eve and the Apple,” by Kaj Neilsen. He was also a regular supporter of fine music in the New York. In addition to supporting local institutions like the Metropolitan Opera, he underwrote most of the costs of an annual Summer music concert series held at the Lewisohn Stadium, alongside Minnie Guggenheimer. The series sported some of the best international performers in the classical world, and due to Lewisohn's generosity, ticket prices were very inexpensive and affordable to what he termed 'the every day man'. He was also an active philanthropist in the Jewish community, donating to Mount Sinai Hospital and the Orphanage of the Hebrew Sheltering Guardian Society of Pleasantville, New York. He also served as President of the Hebrew Technical School for Girls.

== Personal life ==
Adolph married Emma Cahn on June 26, 1878, in Manhattan when he was 29 years old. The couple had two children, Adele (born 1882) Samuel (born 1884). Sam would go on to follow in his father's his footsteps, and continued his law practice. Adele Married into the prominent Lehman family.

Adolph Lewisohn died on August 17, 1938, at his Upper Saranac Lake camp, Prospect Point Camp.
