= Lillie Lewisohn Vogel =

American art collector and philanthropist (1876–1976)

- Born: November 26, 1876; New York City, New York, United States
- Died: June 16, 1976 (aged 99); Washington, D.C., United States
- Occupations: Art collector, philanthropist, socialite
- Known for: Philanthropy; lender to the 1913 Armory Show
- Parent: Leonard Lewisohn

Lillie Lewisohn Vogel (26 November 1876, New York, New York – 16 June 1976 Washington, D.C.) was an art collector, philanthropist, and socialite from New York City. Her father was the German-born Jewish American philanthropist Leonard Lewisohn.

In girlhood, Lillie shuttled between New York, London, and Paris. Her family’s wealth supported institutions such as Lewisohn Stadium, a nucleus of the Metropolitan Museum’s costume wing, the Neighborhood Playhouse, and the Henry Street Settlement. Lewisohn herself started a home for “wayward girls” and a restaurant in the New York factory district for working girls. In London, she and her friends ran a charity flower shop. Lewishohn later operated an antiques shop in New York to fund gardens along the East River, which was “where tenement children might first glimpse their first growing plant.” Her philanthropy extended to a practice called “home hospitality”: dinner guests ranged from ambassadors to taxi drivers. She was a lender to the 1913 Armory Show. In a 1972 article, which estimated Lillie to be over 94 (she was 95), she was said to have forgotten her age. “Don’t ask me. I can’t remember and I’m sure if I did, I’d be so old, I’d have to bury me.”
