= Skindergade 6 =

Building in Copenhagen, Denmark

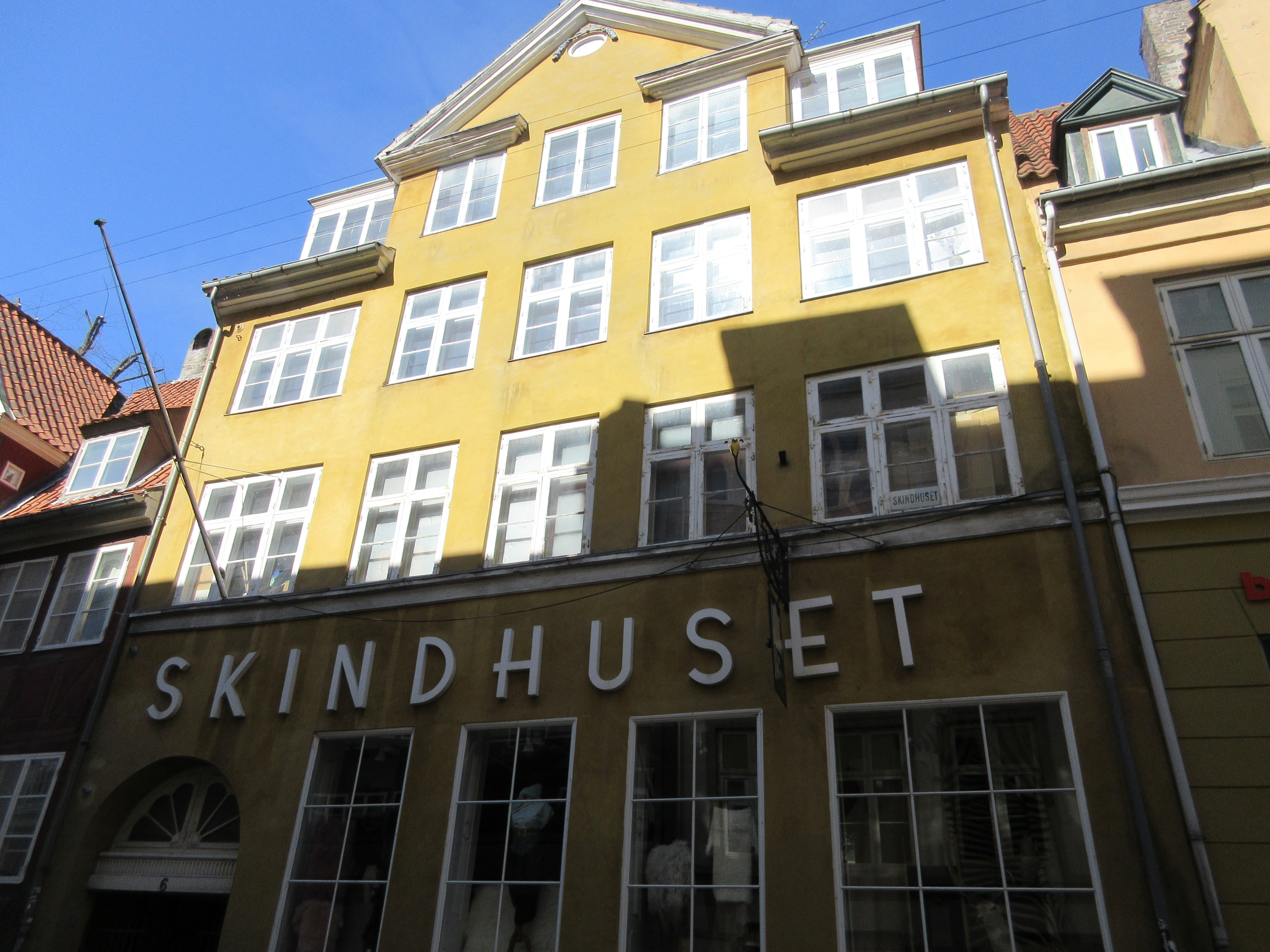

General information
- Location: Copenhagen, Denmark
- Coordinates: 55°40′51.02″N 12°34′33.53″E
- Completed: 1734

Skindergade 6 is an 18th-century property situated on Skindergade, off the shopping street Købmagergade, in the Old Town of Copenhagen, Denmark. It was listed in the Danish registry of protected buildings and places in 1950. Former residents include the later Governor-General of the Danish West Indies Peter von Scholten, composer Hardenack Otto Conrad Zinck, linguist Rasmus Rask and clockmaker and politician Henrik Kyhl. Skindhuset, a retailer of leather products, is based in the building.

== History ==
=== 17th to 18th century ===
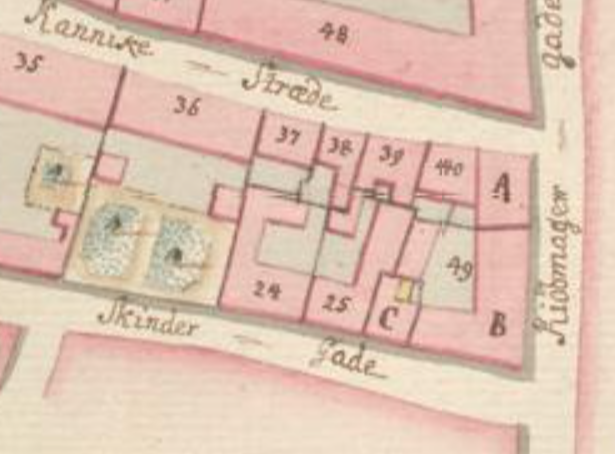
No. 25 seen on a detail from Christian Gedde's map of Klædebo Quarter, 1757.

In the late 17th century the site was part of a larger property. In 1689 it was listed as No. 26 in Klædebo Quarter and occupied by assistant pastor at Trinitatis Church, Poul Andersen Holm. Holm served as assistant pastor at the church from 1665 to 1697. The property was among buildings in the area destroyed in the Copenhagen Fire of 1728. The property was subsequently divided into what is now Skindergade 6 and Skindergade 8. The current building on the site was constructed in 1730–1734 for tailor Johan Krøyer. As of 1756 the property was owned by tailor Niels Hansen Bunck and listed as No. 25. The perpendicular wing of the building was constructed sometime between 1667 and 1754.

In 1767, the property was purchased by organ builder Moritz Georg Moshack for 56,000 rigsdaler. He had just sold a property at the corner of Store Kongensgade and Dronningens Tværgade. He was married to Anna Catharina Rasmussen and the couple had five children. Their eldest son died at half a year of age in 1767. Their youngest daughter died in November 1772. Moshack died just one month later (14 December) from an "aggressive fever". His widow was granted permission to retain undivided possession of the estate. She seems to have continued the business in some form, probably mainly with repairs and leasing of instruments. She was most likely assisted by Daniel Wroblewsky. He lived in the building in Skindergade for some time. Their younger son died in 1773. In 1775, Anna Catharina fell ill and died. The house was then sold at public auction. Their two surviving daughters were placed in the custody of Vejsenhuset.

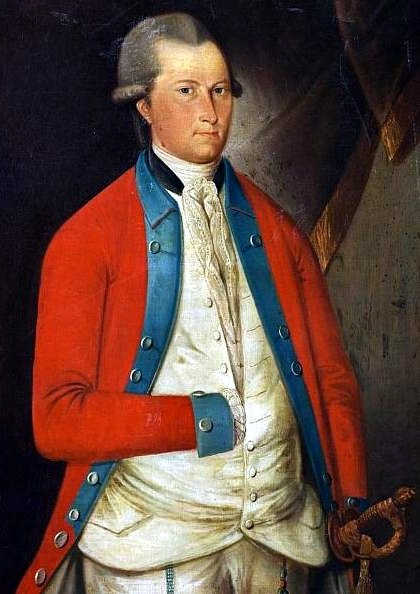
Casimir Wilhelm von Scholten

The property was, at the time of the 1787 census, home to 38 people distributed among six households. Johan Knøblau, a master saddler, resided in the building with his wife Augusta Margrethe and their two sons (aged 10 and 14). Casimir Wilhelm von Scholten, then an army captain in the Crown Prince's Regiment, resided in the building with his wife Catrine Elisabet and their three sons (aged one to four), a caretaker and two maids. Scholten would later serve as Governor of St. Thomas and St. John. One of the three sons was the three-year-old Peter von Scholten, Governor-General of the Danish West Indies from 1827 to 1842, remembered for his role in the abolition of slavery. Søren Kiersgaard, an employee at the Royal Porcelain Manufactory, resided in the building with his wife Anna Margrete, their ten-year-old daughter Dorthe Kierstine and one lodger. Andreas Bortig, another employee at the Royal Porcelain Factory, also resided in the building with his wife Christenie, their three daughters (aged three to seven) and his mother-in-law Elisabet Colman. Henrik Brun, a master clockmaker, resided in the building with his wife Gertrud, their three sons (aged seven to twelve), two lodgers and one maid. Lovise Rupe, a widow, resided in the building with her three-year-old son.

The actor Ferdinand Lindgreen (1770–1842) was among the residents of the building from 1792 to 1798. He was particularly known for his leading roles in comedies by Ludvig Holberg.

=== 19th century ===
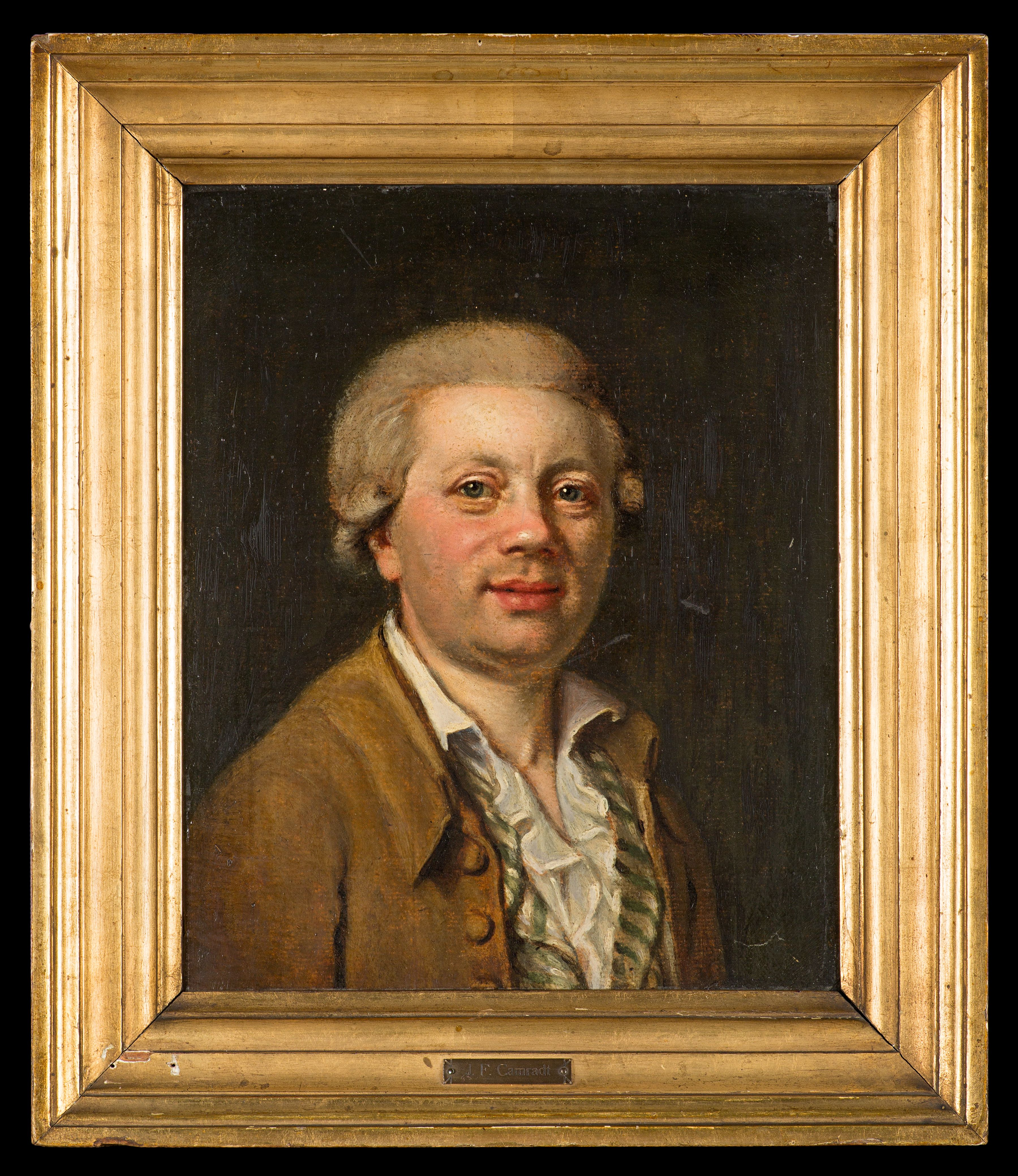
Hardenack Otto Conrad Zinck

At the time of the 1801 census, the property was home to seven households. Hans Christopher Weighorst, a master saddler and the owner of the property, resided there with two step sons (aged 20 and 30), a nephew (aged 13), two saddlers, two apprentices and one maid. Hans Christian Swanekier, a customs officer, resided in the building with his wife Anne Frideriche Kibnase, their four children (aged two to eleven), one maid and one lodger. The lodger Anne Marie Sørensdatter was employed with needlework. Hardenack Otto Conrad Zinck, a composer and singing instructor, resided in the building with his wife Susanne Elisabeth Pontet (Bentet), their two daughters (aged 19 and 22) and one maid. Kirsten Jensdatter, a 65-year-old widow, resided alone in the building. Peter Stoltenberg, a master tailor, resided in the building with his wife Maria Petersen, their seven-year-old daughter Bernhardine Dorethe Stoltenberg, three tailors and one maid. Johan Herman Stallknegt, another master tailor, resided in the building with his wife Sophie Cathrina Arialain and their one-year-old son Georg Ferdinand Edvard Stallknegt. Hendrich Friderich Bruun, a master shoemaker, resided in the building with his wife Gertrud Nielsdatter, a shoemaker, a shoemaker's apprentice and a poor eight-year-old girl they had opened their home to.

The property was listed as No. 24 in the new cadastre of 1806. It was still owned by Hans Weighorst. It was damaged in the British bombardment of Copenhagen in 1807.

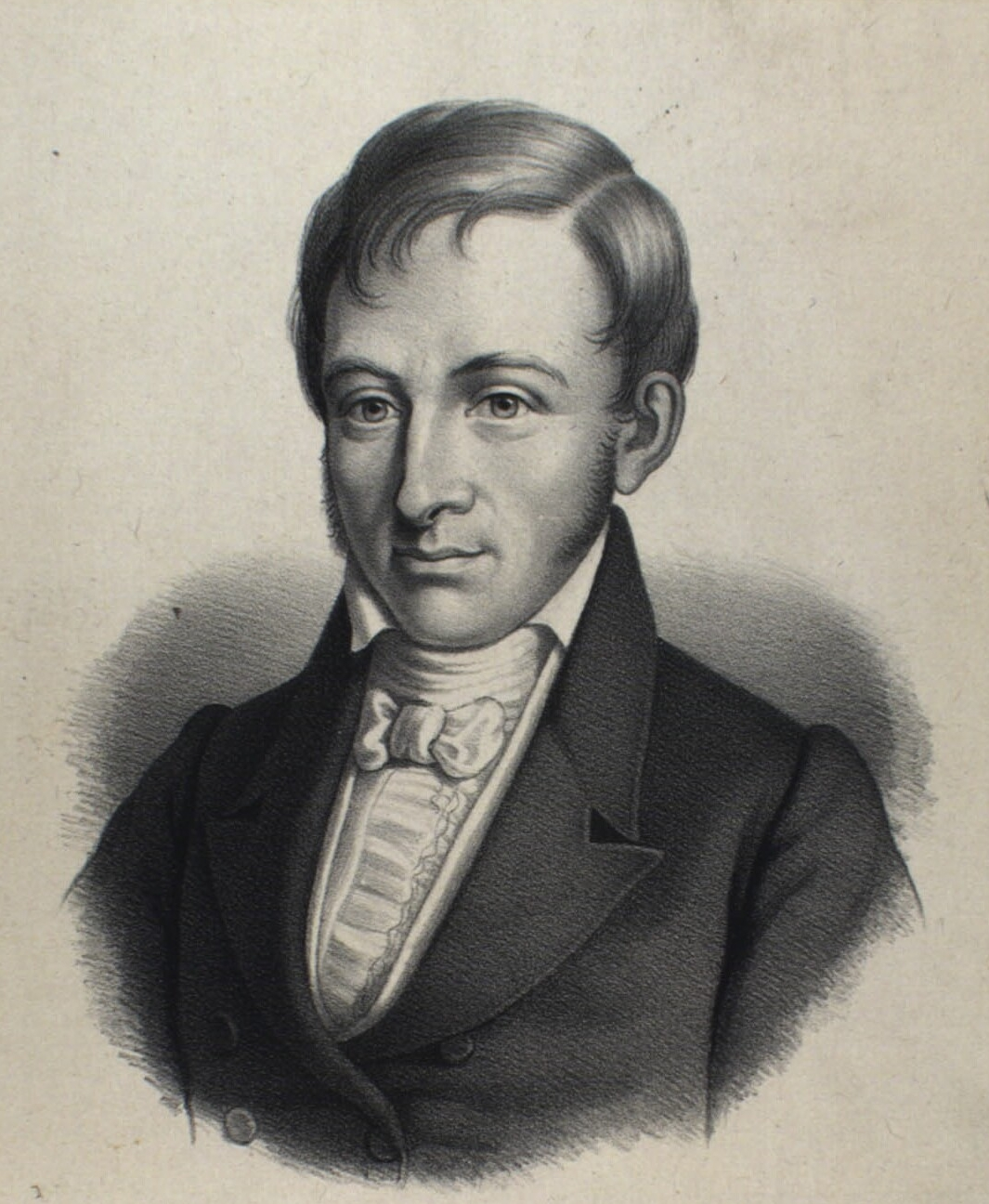
Rasmus Rask

Jacob Jacobsen Dampe, a political activist campaigning for a free constitution, was a resident of the building from 1818. On 16 November 1820, he was arrested in connection with a political meeting at Brolæggerstræde 11. He was subsequently imprisoned in the jail house at Kastellet and later deported to Bornholm. The linguist Rasmus Rask (1787–1832) was a resident of the building from 1831.

The building fronting the street was, at the time of the 1840 census, home to a total of 34 people distributed among five households. Henrik Kyhl (1793–1866), clockmaker and member of Copenhagen City Council, resided on the ground floor with his wife Sophie Dorotea Groskopff, their seven children (aged 5 to 21), two apprentices and one maid. Benedicte Elisabeth Hilker (née Sporon, 1785–1852), widow of the merchant (grosserer) Carl August Hilcker, resided in the building with her daughter Bendicte Frederike Hilker, three-year-old Bendicte Lisbet Hansen and two lodgers. Her father was the prominent Supreme Court attorney Friderich Gottlieb Sporon. Ane Marie Mutherspoch (née Weischer, 1784–1880), widow of Carl Christian Muderspach, the krudtmester at Frederiksværk, resided on the second floor with her three daughters (aged 13 to 21), two lodgers and a maid. One of the two lodgers was the later pastor and politician Aleth Hansen. Frederik Ferdinant Hansen, a book printer, resided on the third floor with his wife Leonora Emilie Kleinsmidt, their three children (aged three to seven) and the wife's mother Ane Martine Kleinsmidt. Christian Petersen Gjerløv, a spækhøker, resided in the basement with his wife Ane Magrete Thorsen and two children (aged 25 and 31). The perpendicular wing was home to another 18 people distributed on six households. They included a master shoemaker on the third floor as well as an employee at Assistenshuset, a shoemaker, a servant, and a couple of unmarried women employed with needlework.

Kyhl was by 1845 still occupying the ground floor apartment. Christian Thomsen Agerskov, a silk merchant, was now residing on the first floor with his sister Caroline Agerskov and one maid. Joseph Staubmann, a 77-year-old physician associated with the Royal Danish Theatre, resided in one of the second floor apartments with his daughter-in-law Marie Staubmann (née Fürst), a copper print engraver. Marie Dorpff (née Phaff), a 52-year-old widow, resided in the other second floor apartment with retired ballet dancer Vilhelmine Johnsen. Jens Peter Kjær, a master saddler, resided on the third floor with his wife Ane Marie Kjær (née Jensen), their six children (aged two to 10) and one lodger. Another 17 people resided in the secondary wing. They included Jeppe Johansen Frendrich, another master saddler, who resided on its third floor (left) with his wife Christine Fendrich and their three children (aged five to 16).

Kyhl was still occupying the ground floor apartment as of 1850. He had a few years earlier succeeded Gerog Carstensen as director of Tivoli Gardens. Jørgen Isak Coldevin Lehne (1783–1866), a manufacturer and army major, resided on the first floor with his wife Lovise Augusta (née Falkengren) and two daughters (aged 27 and 29). Anna Sophie Jackobsen, a 47-year-old woman employed with needlework, resided on the second floor with her four children and a lodger. The tenants on the third floor were a widow needleworker and a tailor. The residents of the secondary wing included a joiner, and a ship captain a clockmaker.

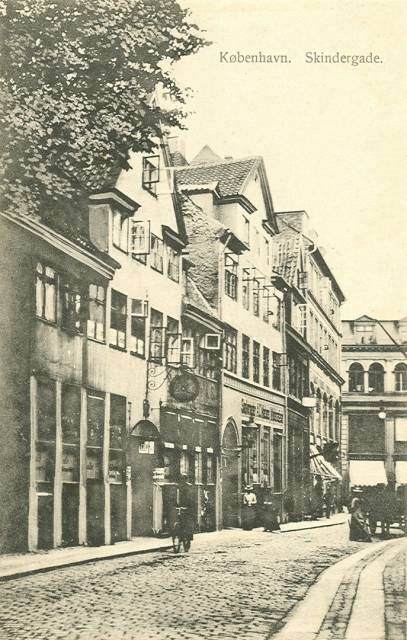
Skindergade 6 on an old postcard.

The building fronting the street was home to a total of 26 people at the time of the 1860 census. Hans Hansen, a dyer, was now residing in the ground floor apartment with his wife Anna Marie (née Bentzen), their seven children (aged seven to 18), a male caretaker and a maid. Jensine Wilbrecht, the 57-year-old widow of an estatsråd, resided on the first floor with 21-year-old Sophie Christensen and one maid. Sophie Jacobsen, a widow needleworker, resided on the second floor with one maid and one lodger. Peter Thylstrup, a master tailor, resided on the third floor with his wife Christine Dorthea Marie (née Bloch), their three children (aged seven to nine) and shoemaker Anders Eckholm. Hans Sørensen Engholm, an innkeeper, resided in the basement with his wife Maren Engholm (née Jensen) and their five-year-old son. Another 20 people resided in the secondary wing.

=== 20th century ===
Henning Amdrup Christensen founded Skindhuset in the building in 1926. The company was later continued by his son Hans Jørgen Amdrup. In 1979, Skindhuset acquired N. F. Larsen.

== Architecture ==
Skindergade 6 is constructed with three storeys over a walk-out basement. Standing on a foundation of field stone, the street face is built with brick with timber framing on the other sides. The yellow-painted, plastered facade is five bays wide, of which the outer bays are wider than the three central ones. The three central bays are crowned by a large gabled wall dormer with cornice returns. The gateway in the bay in the left-hand side of the building is probably a little newer than the building itself. The belt course above the ground floor was added in connection with the renovation of the building following the British bombardment of Copenhagen in 1807. The yard side of the building is finished with black-charred timber framing and iron vitriol yellow in-fills. The steep pitched roof is clad with red tile.

The three-story perpendicular wing is ten bays long. It is constructed with black-charred timber framing and iron vitriol yellow in-fills, save for four bays of the ground floor which are constructed in masonry and painted black. The facade is crowned by a four-bay gabled wall dormer, with a pulley beam above a glazed opening, flanked by two dormer windows. The roof is a mono-pitched mansard roof.

== Today ==
Skindhuset is Denmark's largest retailer of leather products.

== Gallery ==
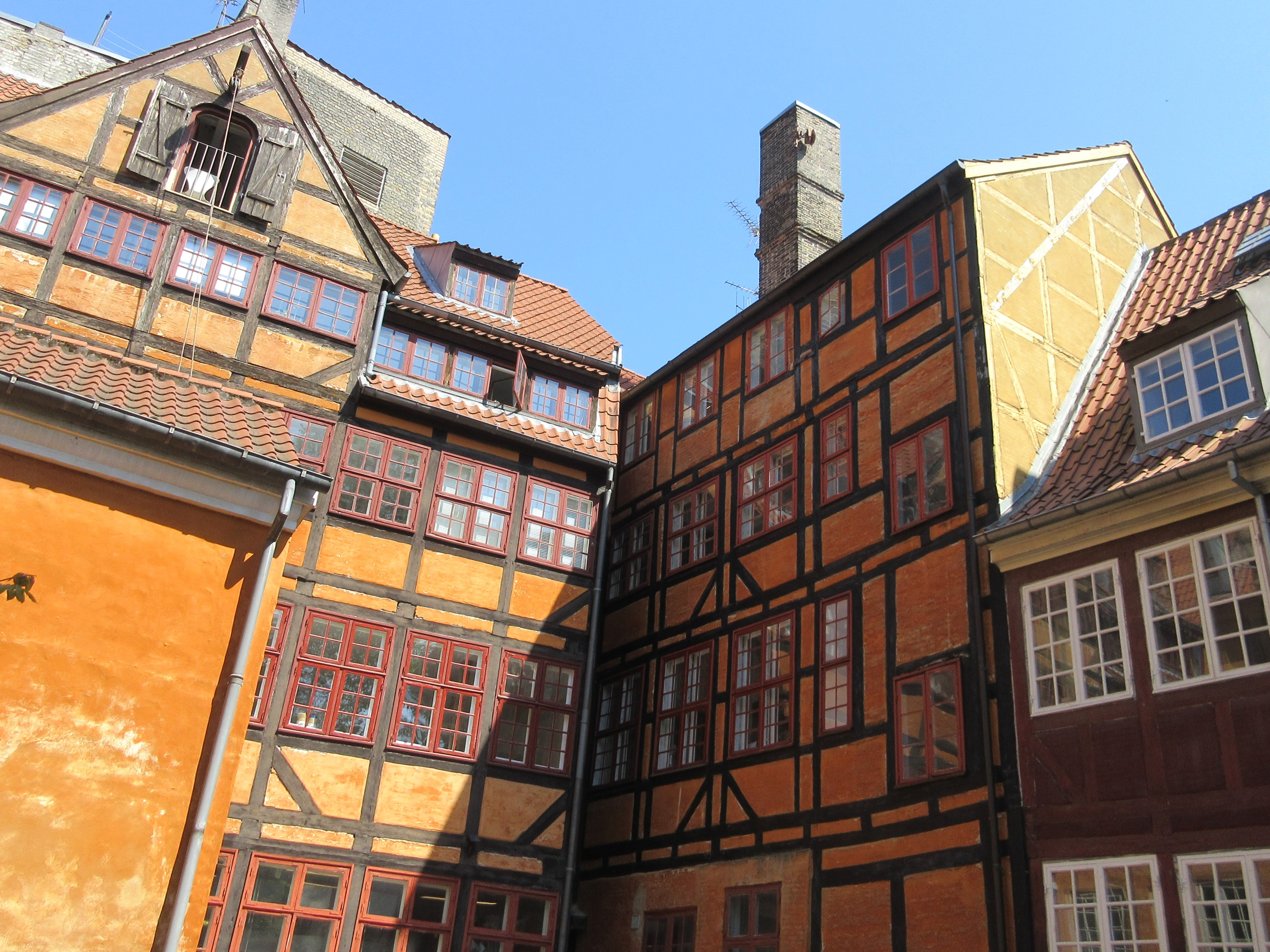

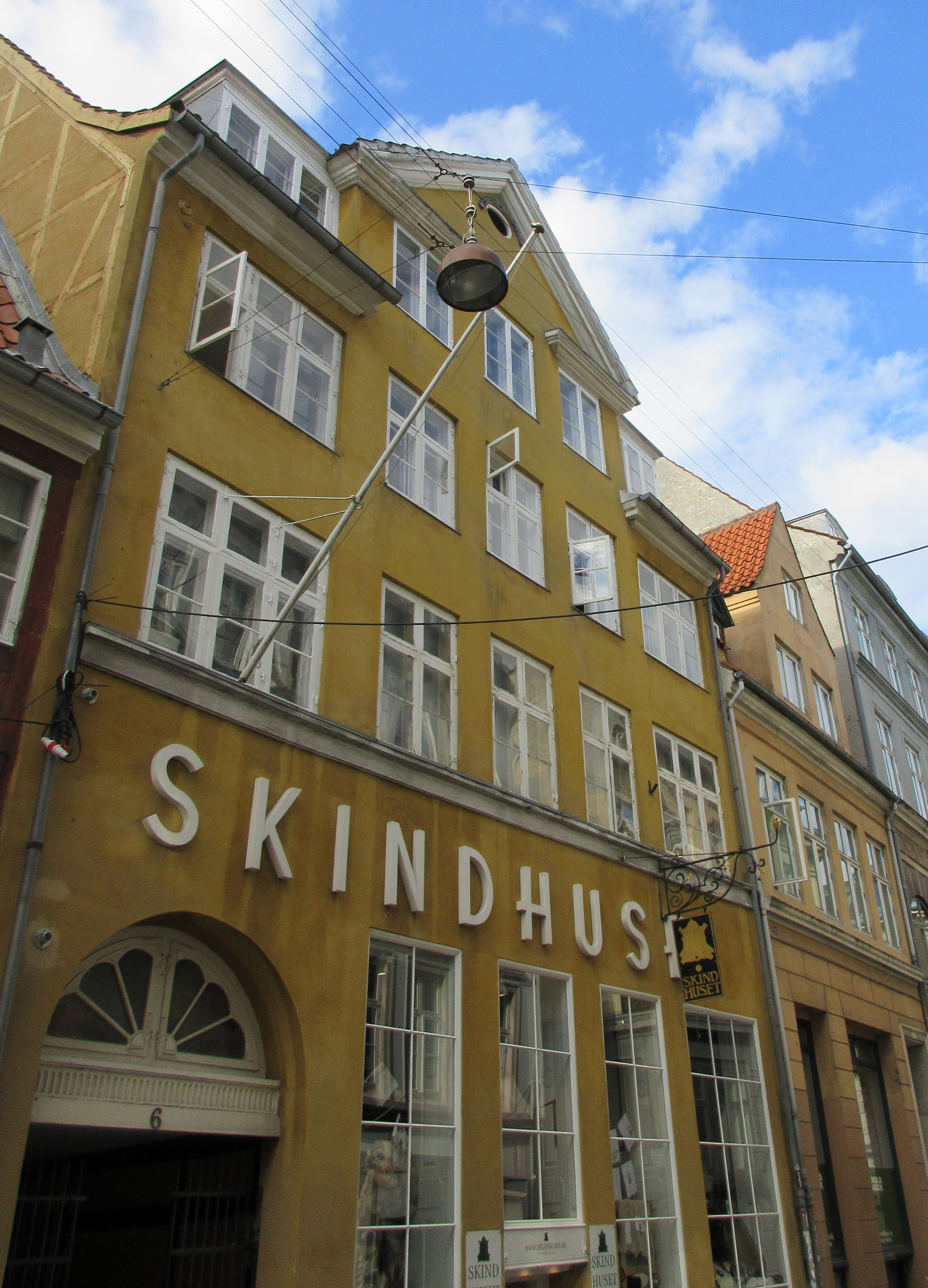
The front of the building

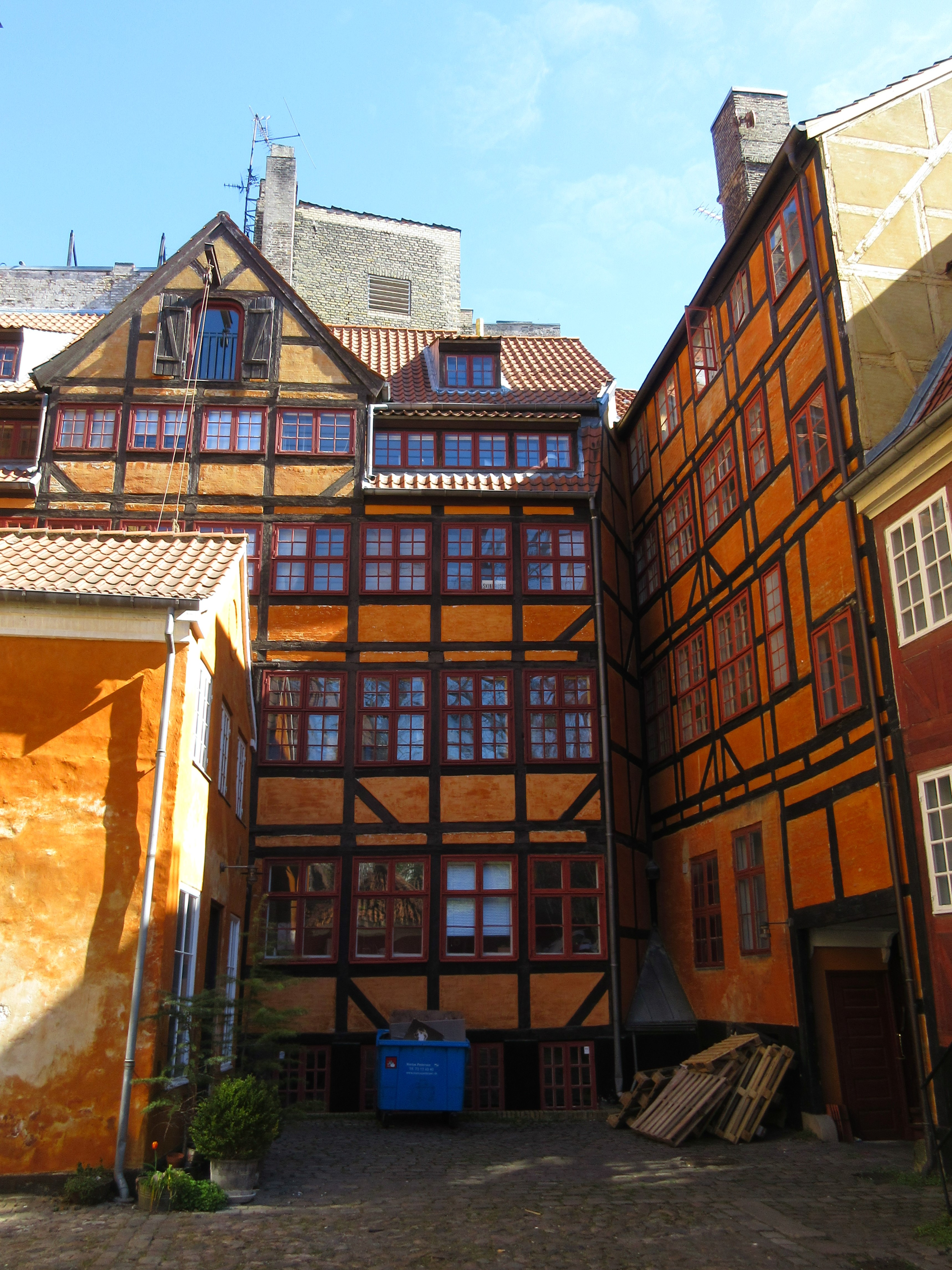
The side wing

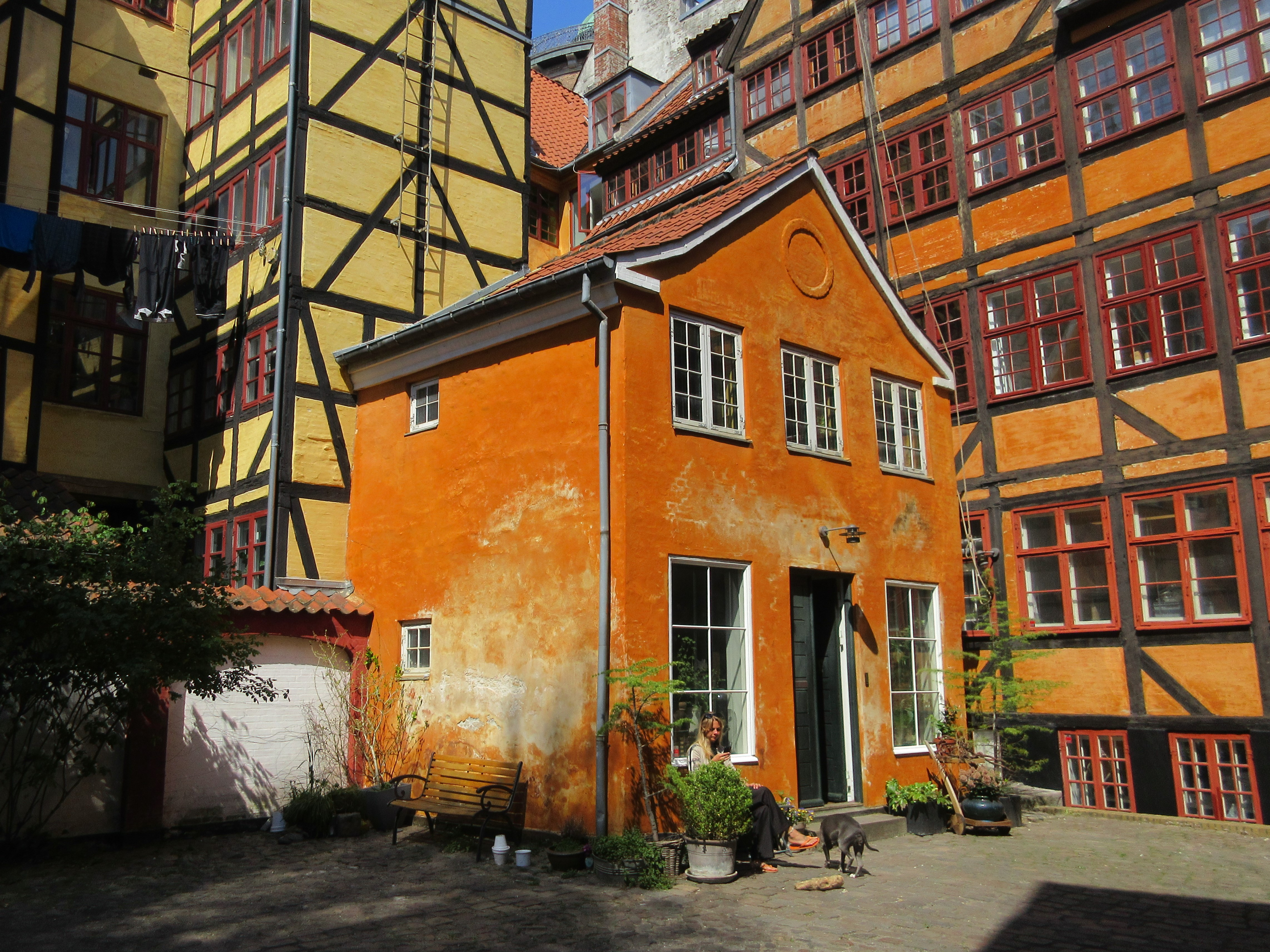
