= Brolæggerstræde 11 =

Building in Copenhagen, Denmark

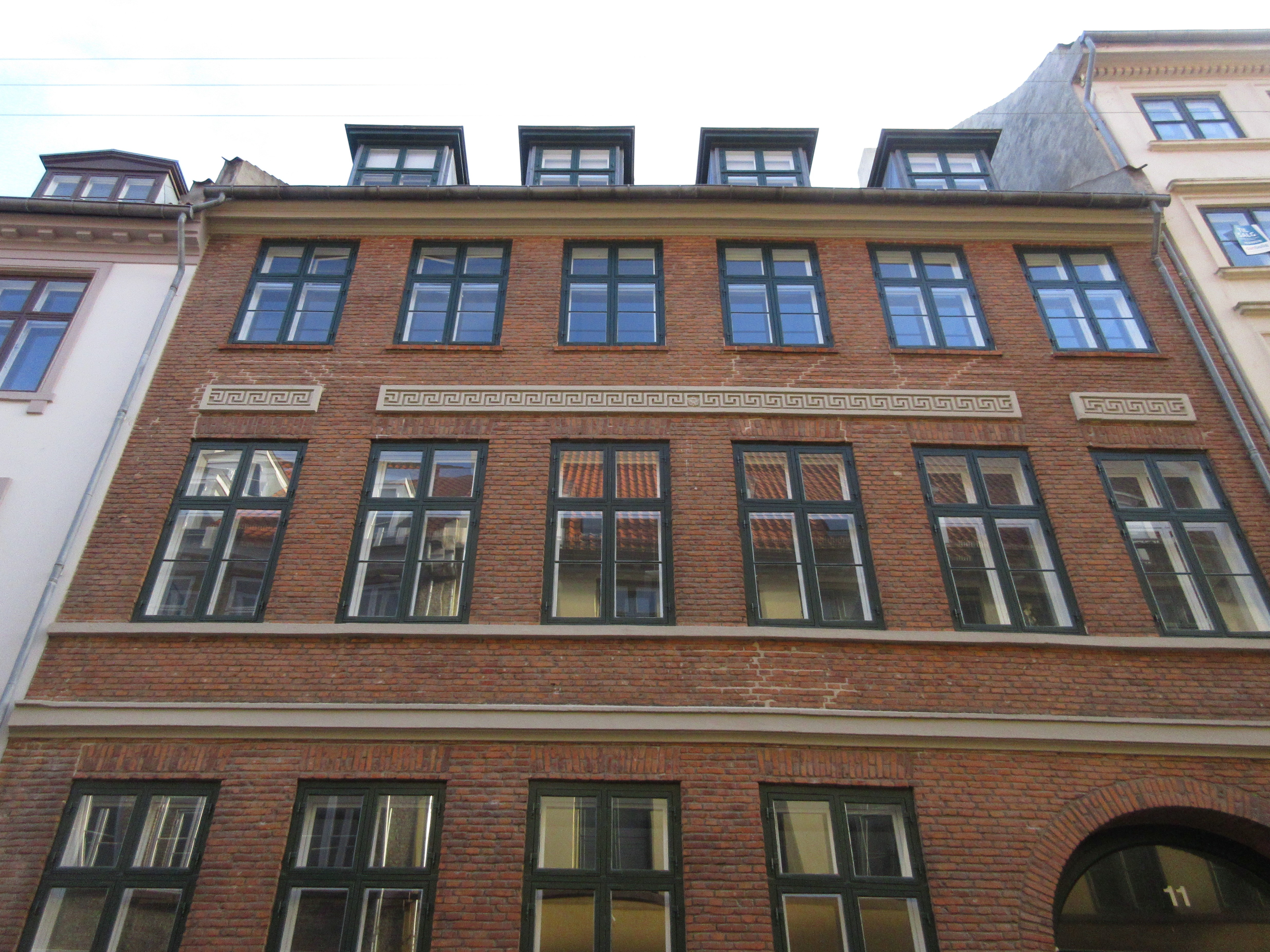
- Interactive map of the Brolæggerstræde 11 area

General information
- Location: Copenhagen, Denmark
- Coordinates: 55°40′38.75″N 12°34′27.98″E
- Completed: 1796

Brolæggerstræde 11 is a Neoclassical property in the Old Town of Copenhagen, Denmark. Jacob Jacobsen Dampe, a political activist campaigning for a free constitution, was arrested in the building on 16 November 1820 for conspiring against the king. The newspaper Socialdemokraten was published from the building from 1889 to 1901. A plaque next to the gate commemorates that the Danish Confederation of Trade Unions (Danish: De Samvirkende Fagforbund) was based at the site from its foundation in 1898 until 1901. The building was listed on the Danish registry of protected buildings and places in 1950.

== History ==
=== Jens Wedege and his brewery ===
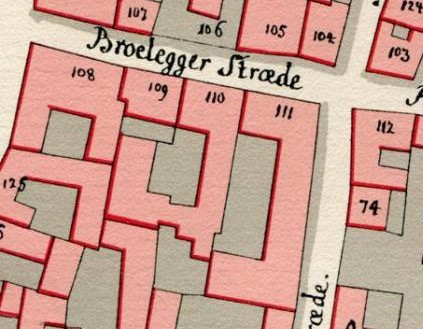
No. 110 seen on Gedde's district map of Snaren's Quarter from 1757

The property was by 1689 as No. 128 in Snaren's Quarter (Snarens Kvarter) owned by councilman Rasmus Nielsen's widow.

The property was acquired in 1749 by Jens Wedege. He was granted citizenship as a merchant (grossererborgerskab) in Copenhagen the same year. In 1750, after being admitted to the Brewers' Guild on 6 April, he established a brewery on his property. The property was listed as No. 110 in the new cadastre of 1756. Wedege also traded in grain and colonial goods.

On 2 December 1765, Wedege was appointed as one of the city's 32 Men. On 25 February 1779, he was elected as deputy chairman. On 8 March 1781, he succeeded ironmonger Christian Poul Freese as chair of the council. Wedege was a member of the Copenhagen Shooting Society from 1767. In 1768, he was appointed as director of Kjøbenhavns Brandforsikring (Copenhagen Fire Insurance).

At the time of the 1787 census, Wedege resided on his property with his wife Marie Dorothea Claussen, two sons (aged 14 and 31), a clerk (fuldmægtig), a caretaker, two brewery workers (bryggersvend and underknægt) and a maid. He died on 24 April 1791 and was buried in the burial chapel of the Church of the Holy Ghost.

=== Andreas Tronier and the new building ===
The property was destroyed in the Copenhagen Fire of 1795, together with most of the other buildings in the area. The current building on the site was constructed in 1796–1797 for brewer Andreas Tronier (1758–1827). Born in Haderslev, he had started his career as a sailor and later become a sea captain. He had probably purchased the property in Copenhagen in connection with his marriage to Anne Susanne Lorck (1769–1833) on 25 May 1792.

At the time of the 1801 census, the property was home to a total of 20 people. The owner Andreas Tronier resided in the building with his wife Anna S. Lock, their two children (aged three and eight) and a maid as well as a brewer (bryggersvend), a brewery boy and a caretaker. Ulrik Christian Kaas, Admiral in the Royal Danish Navy, resided in another apartment with his wife Frideriche Amalia Kaas, a chambermaid (kammerjomfru) and a maid. Niels Mathisen Flygelring and Christian Henrich Carstens, Kaas' ordonnans (soldier carrying out orders for a superior officer) and an assessor, respectively, both in their 20s, shared another dwelling. Kristen Jensen Bagge, the proprietor of the spækhøker shop in the basement, resided in the associated dwelling with his wife Anne Margrethe Bagge and two maids.

The property was listed in the new cadastre of 1806 as No. 73. It was still owned by Tronier at the time. His daughter Anne Marie was married in 1813 to Johannes Wilhelm Plenge, who had been appointed as pastor of Hørsholm Parish the same year.

=== 1729s ===
In 1820, Jacob Jacobsen Dampe planned a political meeting in rented premises in the building. When he and a fellow activist showed up, on 16 November at 8:00, they were arrested by the police on charges of conspiring against the king. In February 1821, Dampe was sentenced to death. His sentence was, however, changed to a life sentence and he was subsequently imprisoned first at Kastellet and then on the isle of Ertholmene. He was granted amnesty in 1848 under the new King Frederick VII of Denmark.

=== Jens Christian Bjerre ===
The property was later owned by brewer Jens Christian Bierre. He was the son of distiller Søren Bjerre. Two of his brothers were also brewers. The elder brother Andreas Hansen Bjerre owned the brewery at Store Kongensgade No. 55 (now Store Kongensgade 63). The younger brother Nicolai Bjerre owned the property Kompagnistræde 20.

At the time of the 1840 census, No. 73 was home to a total of 38 people. Jens Christian Bjerre (1801–1879), a brewer, resided on the ground floor with his wife Petrine (née Winsløv, 1805–1876) their five children (aged seven to 21), a theology student, five male employees and two maids. Johanne Andrea Svenson (1777), widow of a commander, resided with two unmarried daughters, a servant and a maid on the first floor. Johan Fredrik Redsted (1790–1858), captain in the 1st Schleswig Regiment, resided with his wife and seven children on the second floor.

With the introduction of house numbering in Copenhagen in 1859, No. 73 became Brolæggerstræde 11. At the time of the 1860 census, the property was home to a total of 30 people. The residents included catechist at the city's Jewish congregation, Esaias Levison (1803–1891), as well as a retired military officer with the rank of colonel-lieutenant and a former brewer with their respective families.

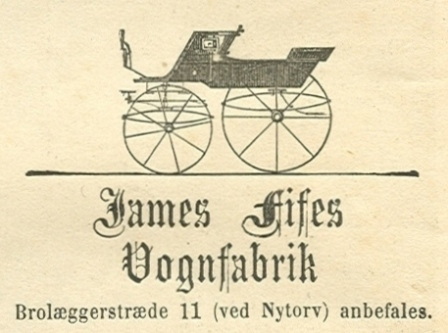
Advert for James Fifes Vognfabrik in Illustreret Tidende, 1873.

The coachmaking firm James Fifes Vognfabrik operated a branch office in the building during the 1870s. The main branch was based at Lille Strandstræde 20. The company was founded by James Fife (1759–1814) around 1803. It was later continued by his son Henry Fife (1804–1876).

The social democratic newspaper Socialdemokraten was based in the building from autumn 1889 with Emil Wiinblad (1854–1935) as editor in chief. The newspaper was printed by Cohens Bogtrykkeri in the yard. It had until then been published from rented premises at Nøregade 5. The Danish Confederation of Trade Unions (De Samvirkende Fagforbund) was founded in the building in 1898. In 1901 Socialdemokraten bought its own building in Farimagsgade.

== Architecture ==
Brolæggerstræde 11 is constructed in brick with four storeys over a walk-out basement and is six bays wide. The facade is horizontally divided by a projecting sandstone band over the ground storey and a narrower sandstone band under the windows of the first floor, as well as a Meander frieze under the four central and two outer windows on the second floor. The roof is clad with red tiles and features four dormer windows. A six-bay perpendicular side wing with a chamfered corner bay extends from the rear side of the building.

== Gallery ==
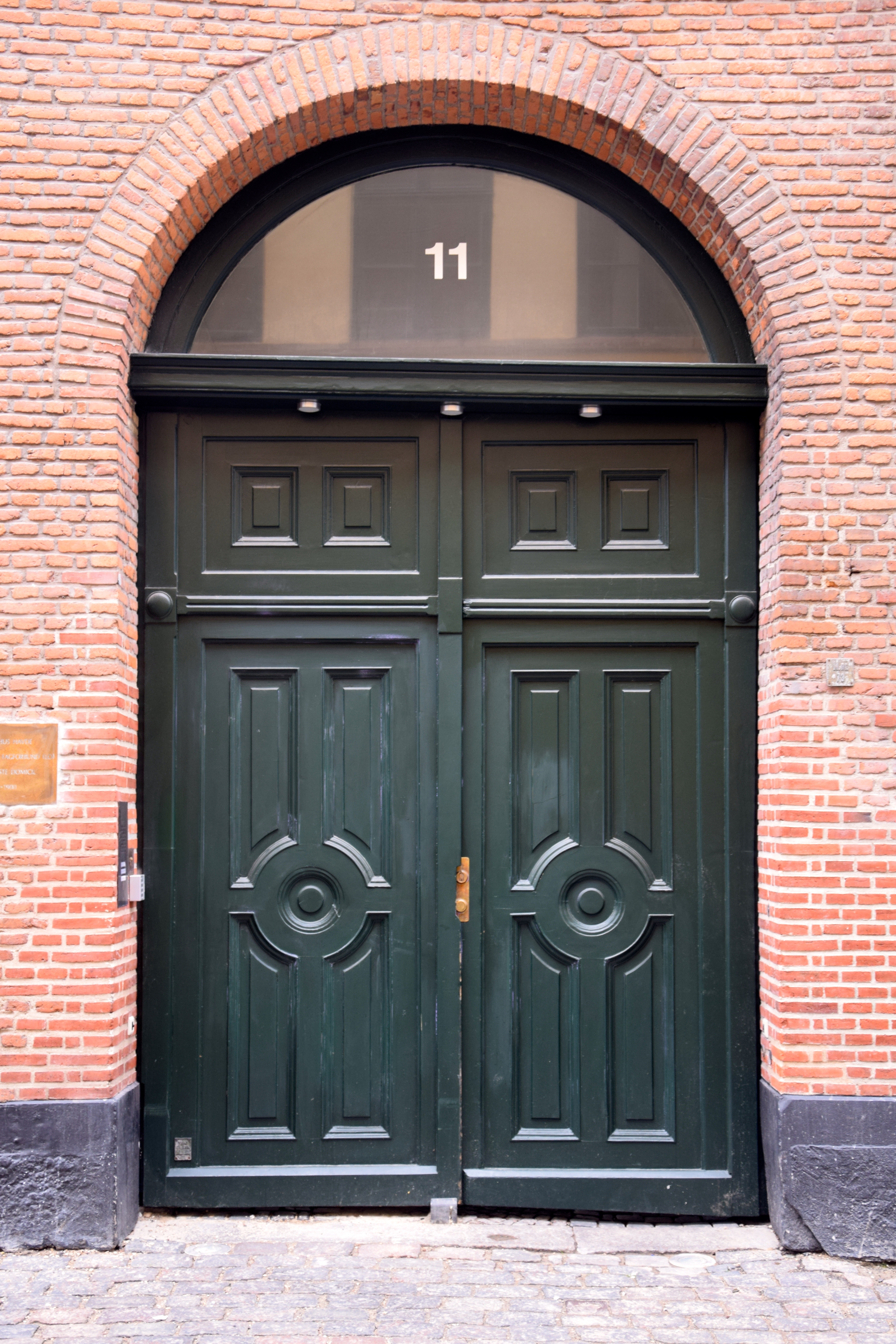
The gate

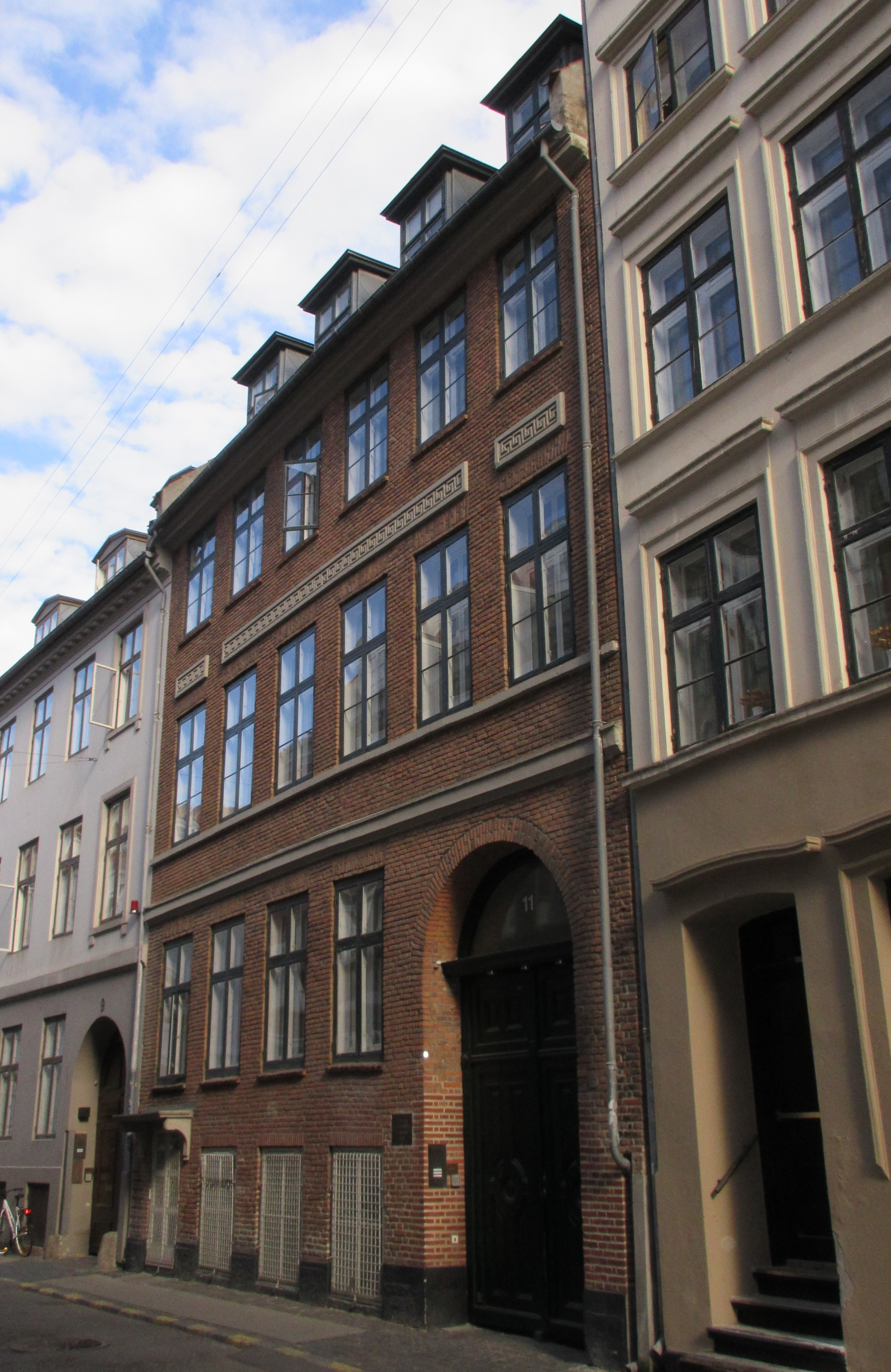
Facade

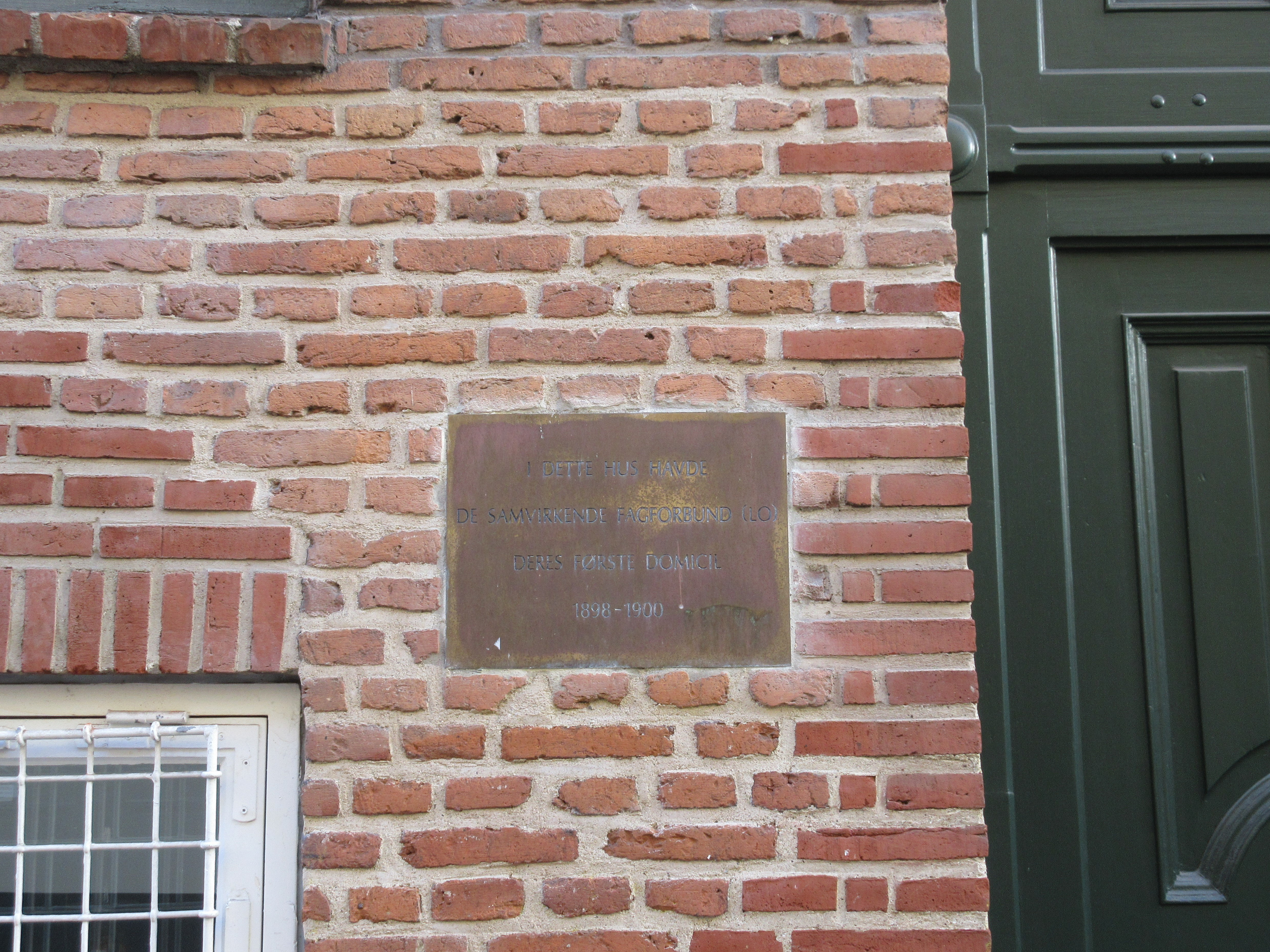
The commemorative plaque
