= Skindergade 8 =

Building in Copenhagen, Denmark

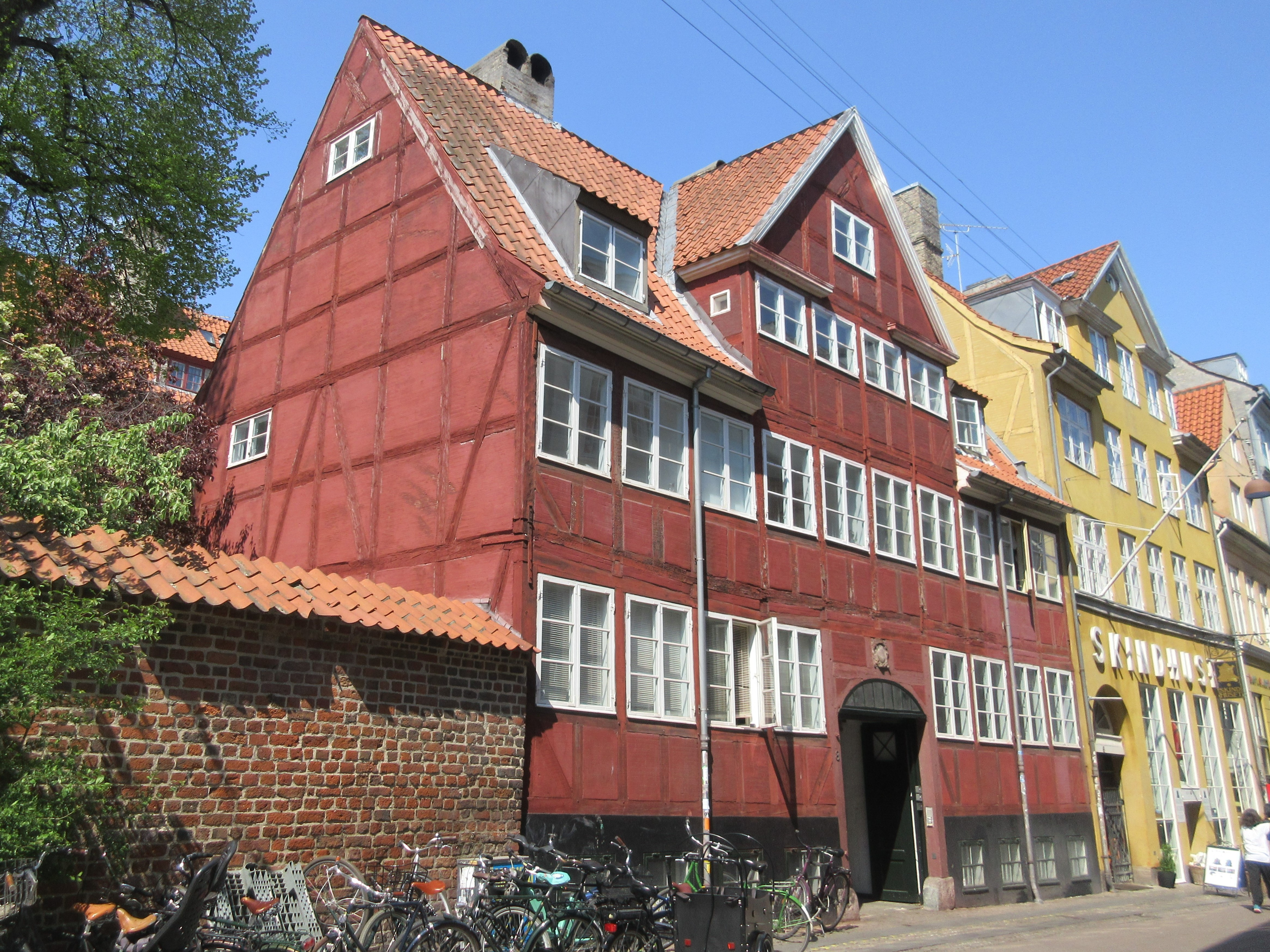
- Skindergade 8 in 2023.
- Interactive map of the Skindergade 8 area

General information
- Location: Copenhagen, Denmark
- Coordinates: 55°40′50.77″N 12°34′33.06″E
- Completed: 1734

Skindergade 8 is a timber framed property situated on Skindergade, off the shopping street Købmagergade, in the Old Town of Copenhagen, Denmark. Constructed in 1733 as part of the rebuilding of the city following the Copenhagen Fire of 1728, it is one of the oldest buildings in the street. It was listed in the Danish registry of protected buildings and places in 1950.

== History ==
=== 18th century ===
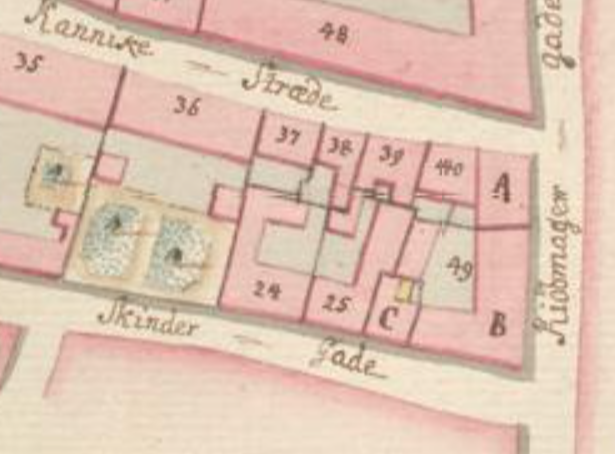
No. 25 seen on a detail from Christian Gedde's map of Klædebo Quarter, 1757.

In the late 17th century the site was part of a larger property. It was listed as No. 26 in Klædebo Quarter in 1689, occupied by assistant pastor at Trinitatis Church Poul Andersen Holm. Holm served as assistant pastor at the church from 1665 to 1697. Together with most of the other buildings in the area, the property was destroyed in the Copenhagen Fire of 1728. It was subsequently divided into what is now Skindergade 6 and Skindergade 8. The current building on the site was constructed in 1733 for Niels Hansen Sandager. The property was listed as No. 24 (new number) in 1756, owned by brewer Søren Seerup.

At the time of the 1787 census, No. 24 was home to a total of 35 people distributed among seven households. The tenants included a number of master craftsmen.

=== 19th century ===
At the time of the 1801 census, No. 24 was home to a total of 33 people distributed among nine households. Christen Krogh, a distiller and the owner of the property, resided in the building with his wife Marie Birgitte Michelsdatter, their two children (aged two and five), a distiller and a maid. Jens Peter Smidt, a master button maker, resided in the building with his wife Maria Bøye and their six-year-old son. Sara Jacobsen, a 59-year-old widow, resided in the building with her 20-year-old niece Cathrine Sophie With, a 40-year-old tailor, a maid and a lodger. Mathias Høffner, a mailman, resided in the building with his wife Sidse Henningsen, their one-year-old son Ernst Christian Høffner and the wife's 31-year-old sister Kirstine Henningsen. Margrethe Cathrine Wilken, a 78-year-old widow, resided alone in the building. Amon Thorstensen, a 57-year-old coachman, resided in the building with his wife Karen Larsdatter and their 30-year-old son Lars Christian Amonsen. Isach Lund. a master shoemaker, resided in the building with his wife Sophie Echhart, their nine-year-old son Hørgen Hartvig Edmund Lund, two shoemakers and an apprentice. The apprentice was the wife's 15-year-old brother Friderich Echhart. Niels Petersen, a workman, resided in the building with his wife Ellen Knudsdatter. Willads Jørgensen, a bricklayer, resided in the building with his wife Ellen Marie Synneberg and their one-year-old son Hans Peter Jørgensen.

The property was listed as No. 23 in the new cadastre of 1806. It was owned by Christen Krogh at the time.

At the time of the 1840 census. No. 23 was home to a total of 45 people distributed among seven households. Peter Storm, a master shoemaker, resided on one of the ground floor apartments with his wife Berta Christiane Storm née Rasmussen, their two sons (aged seven and 11), an apprentice and a maid. Carl G. Ryckmann, a master tailor, resided in the other ground floor apartment with his wife M. E. Ryckmann, their three children (aged 11 to 15), two apprentices and one maid. Peter Larsen, a royal stableman, resided on the first floor with his wife Anna Knudsen and two lodgers. Frederik Wilh. Møckel, a master tailor, resided in the other first floor apartment with his wife Anna Margrethe Krogh and clerk in Generaltoldkammeret Jens Mickael Krogh. Iver Nielsen, a servant, resided in one of the second floor apartment with his wife Anne Dorthe Nielsen, three lodgers (all of them soldiers) and two caretakers. Caspar Freder. Møller, a tailor, resided in the other second floor apartment with his wife Ellen Marie Møller and four daughters (aged one to eight). Jørgen Uldum, a policeman, resided in the basement with his wife Trine Wilhelmi. Nielsen and their son Jens Jørgen Uldum. Peter Christian Fogth, a master shoemaker, resided in the other basement apartment with his sister Ane Maria Løvgreen and two apprentices (aged 16 and 18). Niels Ruslander, a master dyer, resided in the rear wing with his wife Juliane Maria Ruslander, a maid and a dyer working for him.

The number of residents had by 1850 increased to 64. Many of the tenants were still master craftsmen. They included a master plumber, a master shoemaker (ground floor, right), a master tailor, a master joiner (second floor, left) and a master shoemaker (first floor of the rear wing, left),

With the introduction of house numbering by street in Copenhagen in 1859, No. 23 was registered as Skindergade 8. At the time of the 1860 census, Skindergade 8 was home to a total of 23 people in the building fronting the street and another 19 residents in the rear wing. Didrik Lønborg, a watchmaker, resided on the ground floor with his daughter Elise Lønborg and two maids.

== Architecture ==
Skindergade is 8 constructed with timber framing on a black plinth, with two storeys over a walk-out basement. The 10-bay-long, red-painted facade is crowned by a three-bay gabled wall dormer, flanked by two smaller dormer windows. The yard side of the roof is pierced by two substantial brick chimneys. The central gateway is younger than the building, probably dating from the second half of the 18th century. The keystone above the gate features the initials NHS (for Niels Hansen Sandager) and the year 1733. The gateway is on the yard side of the building flanked by two doors.

== Today ==
The building was owned by E/F Skindergade 8 until 2008 as condominiums. It is now owned by Ejendomsselskabet Skindergade 8 ApS (founded 8 February 2009).

== Gallery ==
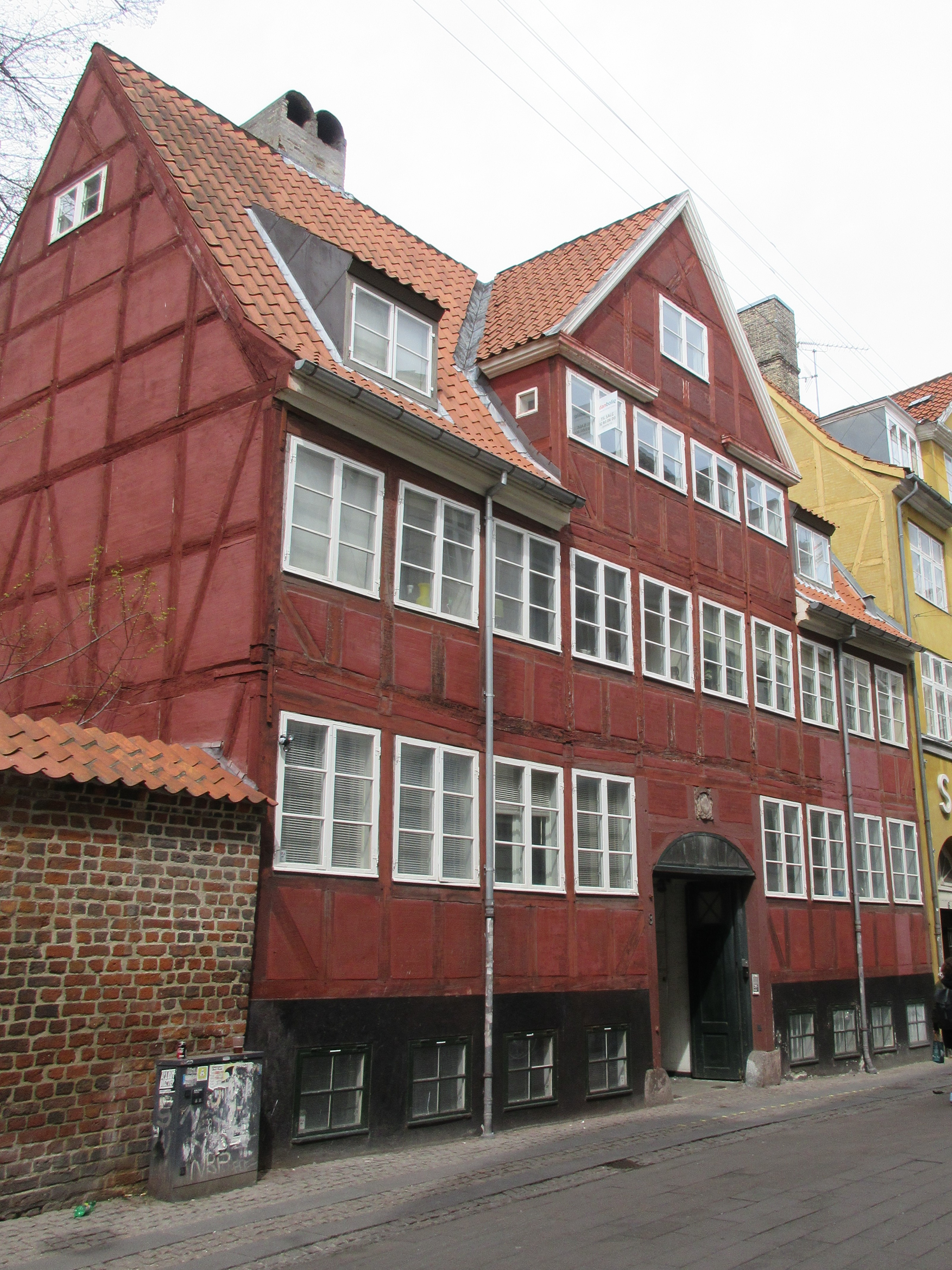
The building seen from the street.

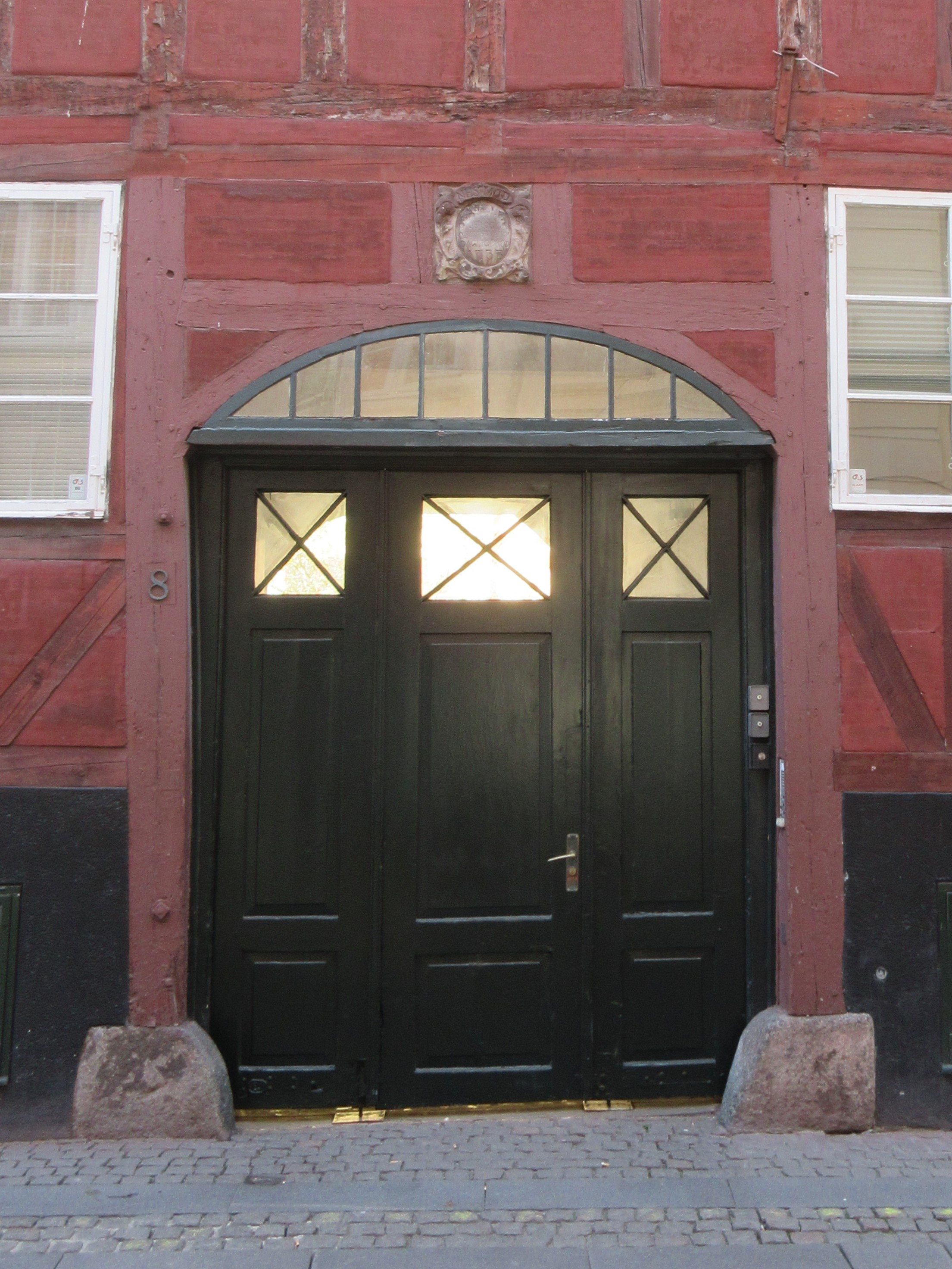
The gate seen from the street.

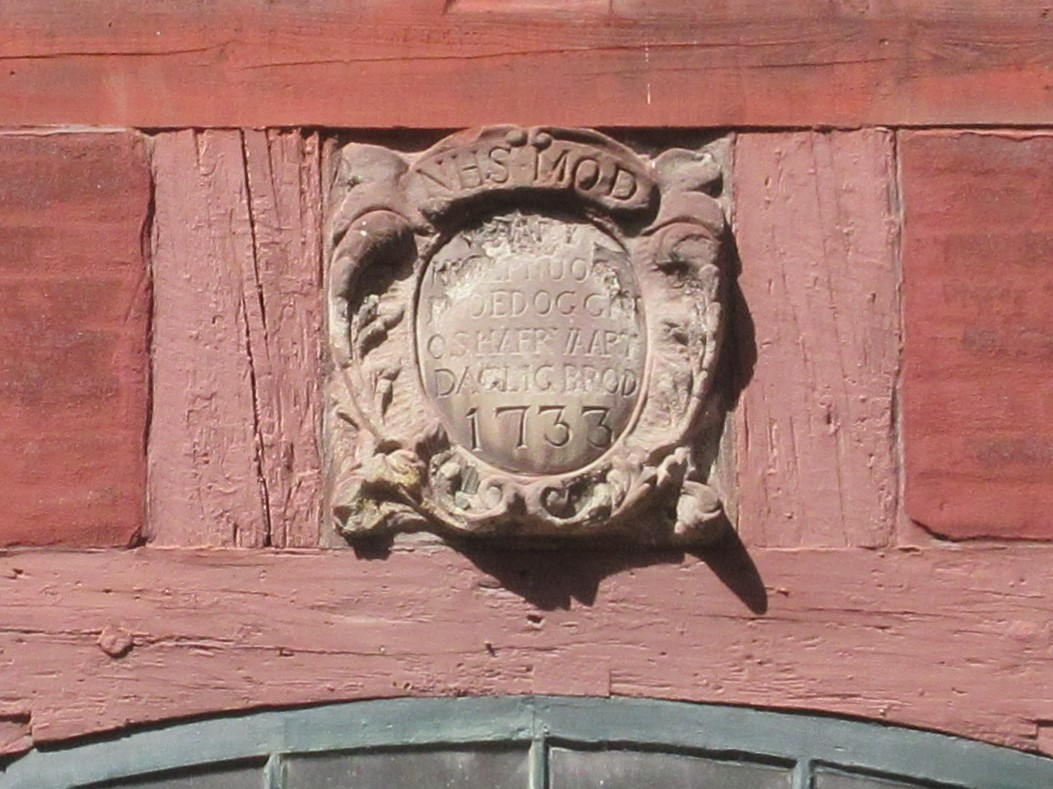
The keystone

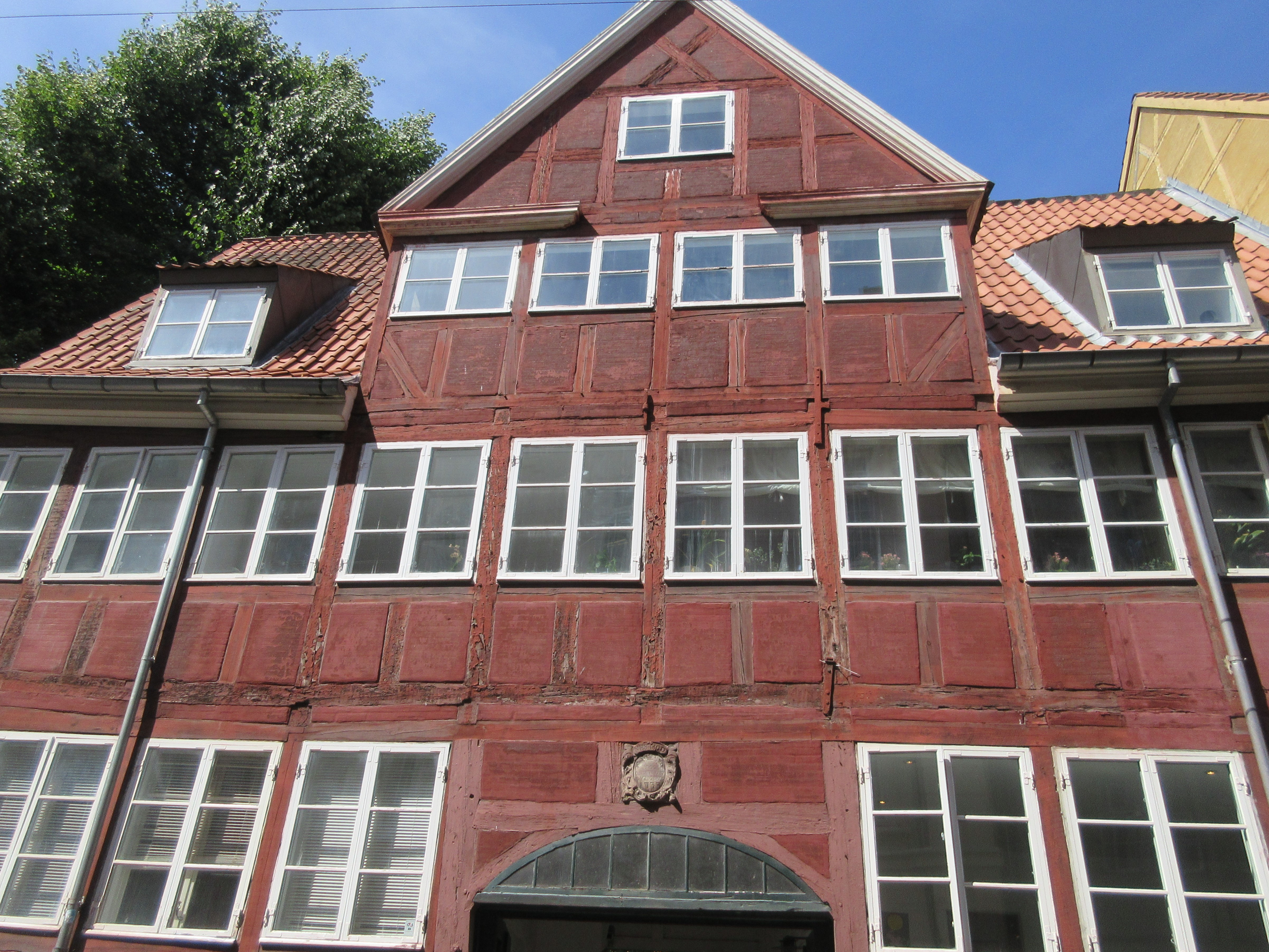
The building seen from the yard.
