= Dampe =

Dampe may refer to:

- Jacob Jacobsen Dampe, Danish theologian
- Dampé, a character in The Legend of Zelda series
- Dark Matter Particle Explorer, a Chinese space observatory that uses the acronym DAMPE
