= Jacob Gude =

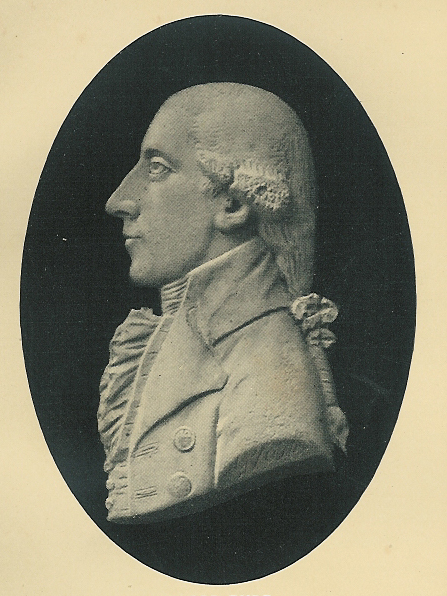
Jacob Gude

Jacob Gude (3 June 1754 - 10 October 1810) was a government official and memoirist from Denmark–Norway. He served as inspector of Waisenhuset from 1783 until his death.

== Early life and education ==
Gude was born on 3 June 1754 in Copenhagen, the son of royal provisions manager (hofproviantforvalter) Niels Gude (not a member of the noble family Gude) and Christine Due. He completed secondary school in 1759 and earned a law degree from the University of Copenhagen in 1775.

== Career ==
In 1774, Gude became a volunteer at Danske Kancelli. He was a fiuend of Bolle Luxdorph. In 1776, he was appointed chancellery secretary. In 1783, he was appointed secretary of the General Church Inspection College (Generalkirkeinspektionskollegiet). In 1793, he was appointed secretary of Collegium de cursu Evangelii promovendo and inspector of Waisenhuset. In 1798, he was awarded the title of kancelliråd. In 1809, he was awarded the title of justitsråd.

== Memoirs ==
Gude wrote his memoirs a few years prior to his death. A shortened version of the extensive manuscript was later published as En kbh.sk embedsmand. J.G.s optegn. 1754-1810 in Memoirer og breve (vol. XXVII, 1918).

== Personal life ==
Gude married on 13 July 1785 to Helene Marie York (1753-1828). She was a daughter of ship captain Niels Valeriussen York and Karen Marie Munck (1728-98(. Her father went down with his ship when she was just a few years old. Her mother was subsequently married to brewer and former DAC captain Andreas Laalle (1736-1804). Jacob and Helene Gude's first home together was on the second floor of Laalle's property at Kompagnistræde 20.
