= Kompagnistræde 20 =

Listed building in Copenhagen

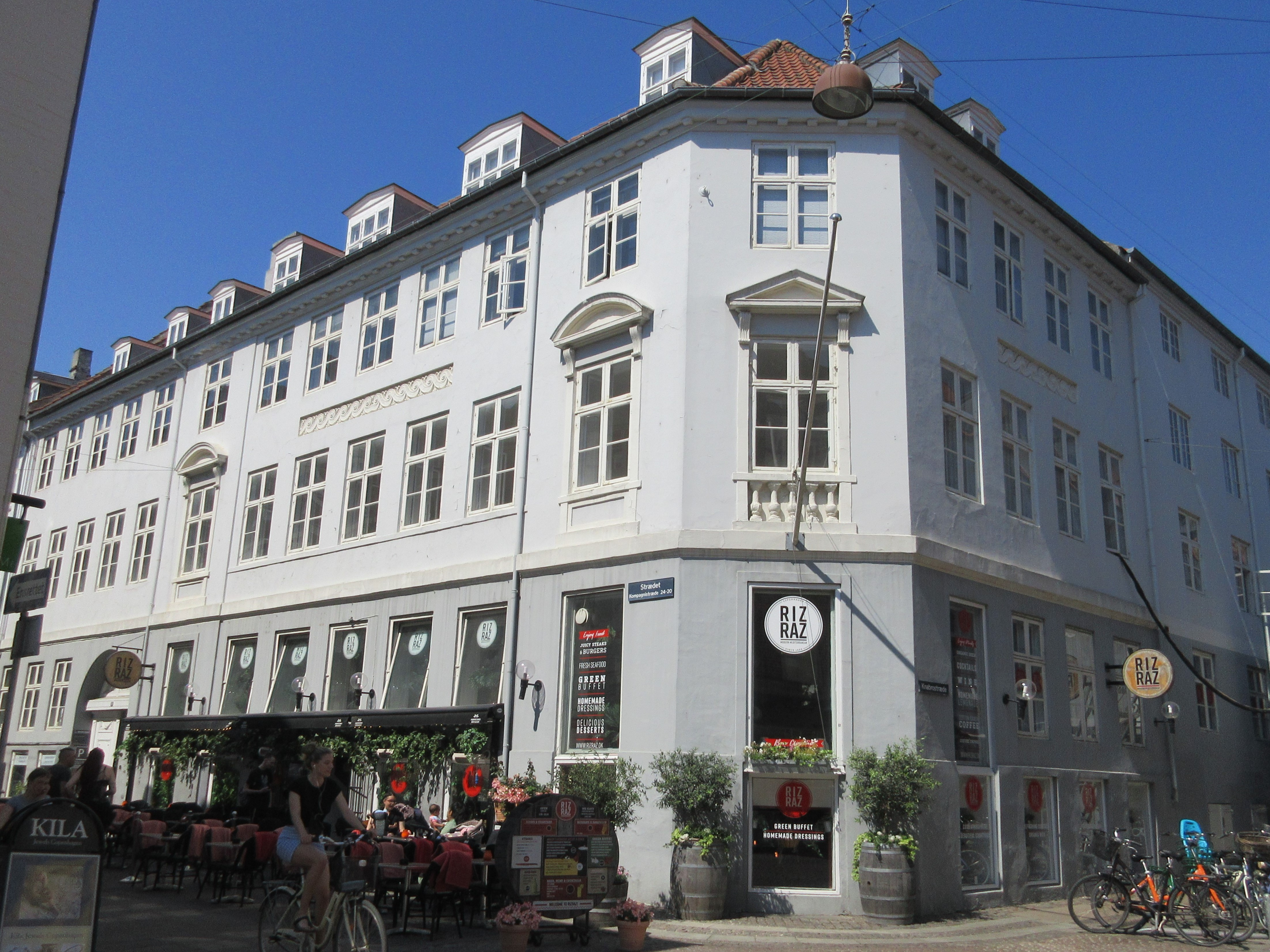
- Interactive map of the Kompagnistræde 20 area

General information
- Architectural style: Neoclassical
- Location: Copenhagen, Denmark
- Coordinates: 55°40′37.42″N 12°34′30.5″E
- Completed: 1796–08

Kompagnistræde 20 is a Neoclassical building complex situated at the corner of Kompagnistræde and Knabrostræde in the Old Town of Copenhagen, Denmark, constructed in 1796–97 as part of the rebuilding of the city following the Copenhagen Fire of 1795. A brewery was for more than 200 years, from at least the late 1640s until the 1860s, operated on the site. The building complex comprises a residential corner building as well as an adjacent warehouse at Knabrostræde 16 and another warehouse in the courtyard. The entire complex was listed in the Danish registry of protected buildings and places in 1945. Notable former residents include the government official Jacob Gude, civil servant and later Minister of Interior Affairs I.J. Unsgaard and painter and photographer Edvard Valdemar Harboe.

== History ==
=== 18th century ===
The corner property belonged to brewer Jacob Pedersen from 1640 to 1645. It was later listed in Copenhagen's first cadastre of 1689 as No. 67 in Snaren's Quarter, owned by brewer Niels Andersen. He owned the property until 1717. By 1728, it belonged to krigsråd Gregorius Wulff, treasurer of Uldmanufakturen. The adjacent property in Kompagnistræde was listed in the cadastre of 1689 as No. 68 and belonged to assessor in kommercekollegiet Hans Nielsen. His widow Kirsten Robring kept the property after his death. Upon her own death, on 19 January 1701, it was sold at auction to their son-in-law Peter Raben (1661–1727). He was admiral in the Royal Danish Navy. His widow Elene Marie Robring owned the property in 1728.

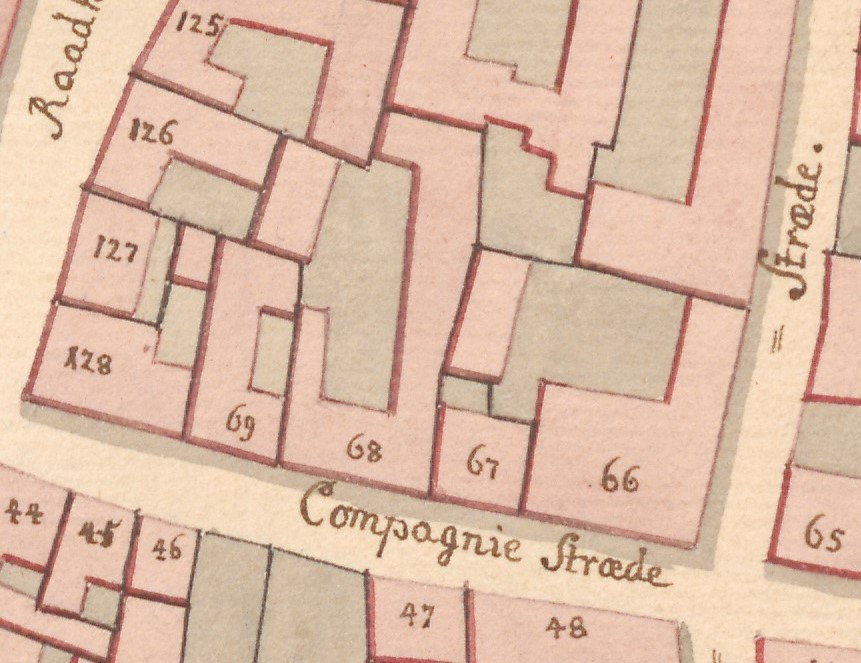
No. 66 and No. 67 seen on a detail from Christian Gedde's map of Snaren's Quarter, 1756.

The old No. 67 was listed in the new cadastre of 1756 as No. 66 and belonged to brewer Christian Veyde at that time. A portion of the old No. 68 was listed as No. 67 and was also owned by him.

Christian Veyde was most likely the father of brewer Jens Christian Veyde but could also be identical to him. Jens Christian Veyde married on 16 April 1758 to Johanne Marie Gamst. She was the daughter of brewer Margrethe Kirstine Gamst (née Juel, widow of brewer Herman Jacobsen Gamst), owner of the brewery on the other side of the street at Kompagnistræde 18. He was the owner of a brewery in Nørregade in 1768.

=== Laalle and the new building ===
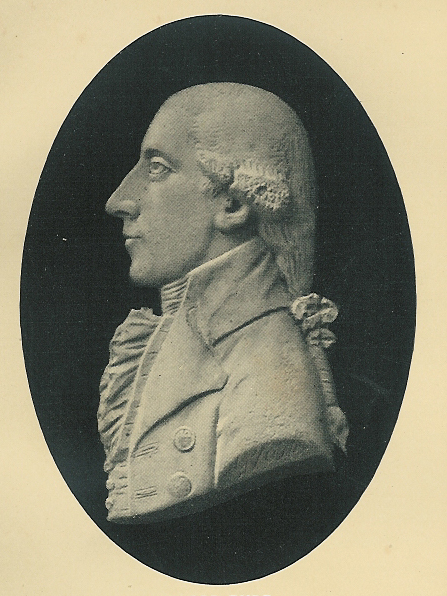
Jacob Gude

The property No. 66/67 was later acquired by brewer Andreas Heinsen Laalle (or Lalle). His property was home to 29 residents in nine households at the 1787 census. The owner resided in the building with his wife Karen Marie, their 16-year-old son Hans Laalle, a brewery worker, a brewer's apprentice, a caretaker and a maid. Jacob Gude (1754–1810), secretary of General-Kirkeinspektionskollegiet, resided in the building with his wife Marie (née Jork, 1761–1828), their two-year-old son Niels Andreas and two maids. Jens Andersen, a cellarman and grocer spækhøker), resided in the building with his wife Anna Jens Datter. Niels Pedersen, a royal stableman, resided in the building with his wife Ane Jens Datter and their two-year-old daughter Ane Kirstine. Hans Borre, a fireman, resided in the building with his wife Magrethe Lars Datter. Christen Hansen, a master tailor, resided in the building with his wife Cicilia Schrøder. Niels Petersen, a court undertaker, resided in the building with his wife Sara Petersen, their two-year-old son Jens Peter and two maids. Anna Leie, a 59-year-old widow, resided in the building on her own. Anna Kirstine Helpap, a 56-year-old unmarried woman, resided in the building with one maid.

The two properties were both destroyed in the Copenhagen Fire of 1795, together with most of the other buildings in the area. The present building on the site was constructed in 1796 for brewer Andreas Lalle.

Anders H. Laalle's property was home to 24 residents in six households at the 1801 census. Anders H. Laalle resided on the ground floor with his son A. Laalle (brewery worker), one more brewery worker (bryggersvend), a brewer's apprentice, a caretaker and two maids. Raphael Aser Unna, a broker, resided on the first floor with his wife Ester Salomon, two unmarried daughters /aged 28 and 43) and the surgeon N. C. Møller. A commander aptain Meier resided on the second floor with the sisters Jacobine Steinfos and Kirstine Steinfos. Morten Rasmussen, a barkeeper, resided in the basement with his wife Ane Cathrine Wilhelmine Bartholin and their two sons (aged three to five). Michael Witterupm a shopkeeper, resided in the other half of the basement with his wife Marthe Marie Hoff and their two daughters (aged two and four). Karen Henningsen, a widow provided for by the Poor Authority, was also residing in the basement.

The property was listed in the new cadastre of 1806 as No. 70 in Snaren's Quarter. It was still owned by Lalle at that time.

=== Nicolay Bierre ===
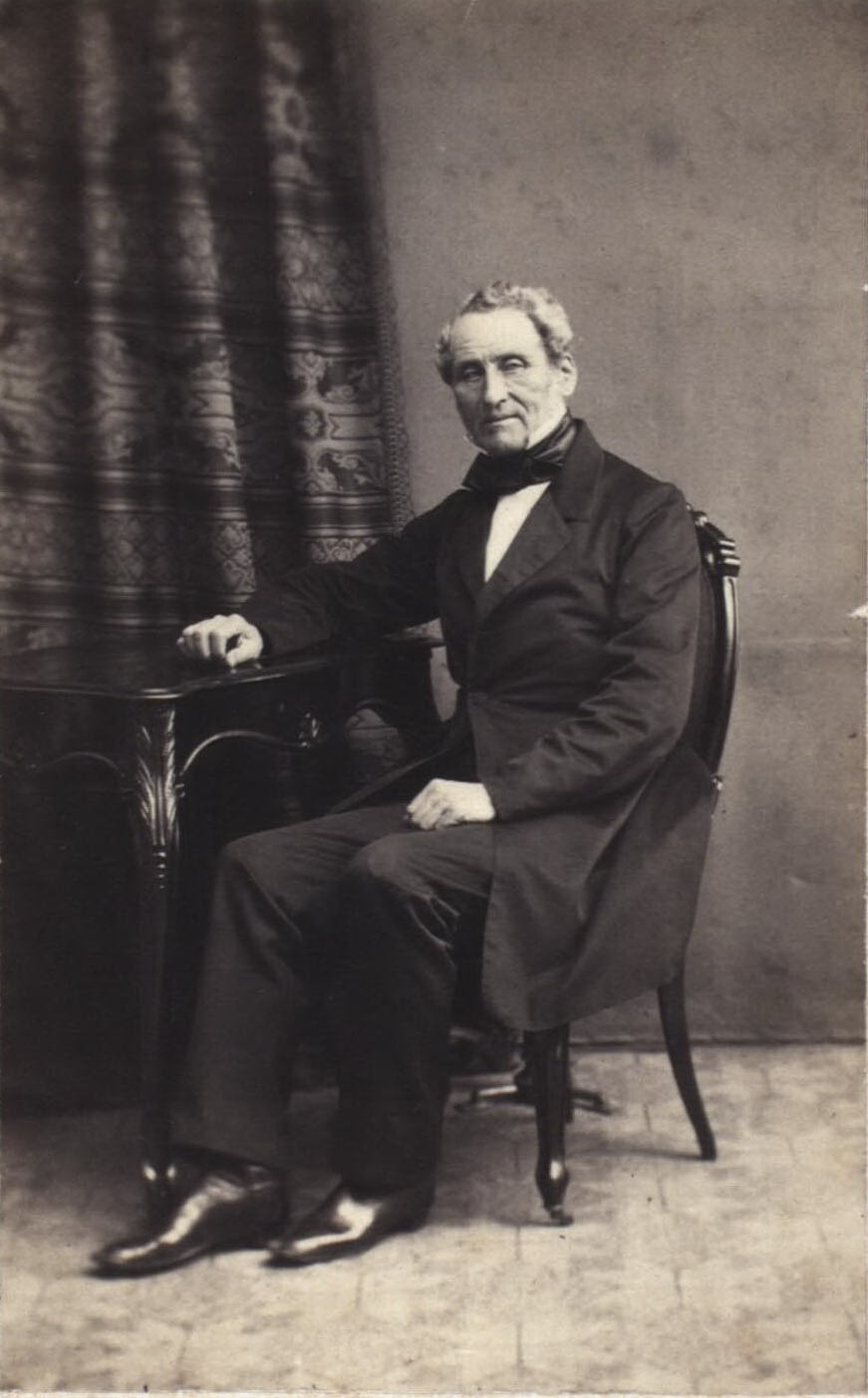
Nicolai Bjerre

The property was later owned by brewer Nicolay Bierre (1688–1867). He was the son of distiller Søren Bjerre. His two eldest brothers were also brewers. The eldest brother Andreas Hansen Bjerre owned the brewery at Store Kongensgade No. 55 (now Store Kongensgade 63). The other brother Jens Christian Bjerre owned the property Brolæggerstræde 11.

Nicolai Bjerre's property was home to 47 residents at the 1840 census. The owner resided on the ground floor with his wife Maria Veile, their daughter Emilie (1825–1924), his niece Thomasine (aged eight) and nephew Søren (aged 13), the instructor sen,-Mand Ernst Kørgensen (theologian), five male servants (probably brewery workers) and two maids as well as the 59-year-old widow Elisabeth Warming (née Byberg, 1781–1845; widow of Christen Larsen Warming, 1754–1819) and her 19-year-old daughter Amalia Warning. Søren Bierre, Nicolai Bjerre's father, a former distiller (whpse wife died in 1833), resided on the first floor with his housekeeper Chrestiane Hansen. I.J. Unsgaard , a government official in the Treasury (kommiteret i Rentekammeret) and later Minister of Interior Affairs, resided on the same floor with his wife Mariane Unsgaard (née Dresing=, their 12-year-old son William Unsgaard and two maids. Thor Nicolai Petersen, a lawyer, resided on the second floor with his wife Conradine Schow, their two children (aged 16 and 18), his sister-in-law Amonine Schou and one maid as well as the 65-year-old widow Maria Hjorth and her maid. Jens Rasmussen, a grocer (høker), resided in one half of the basement with his wife Chrestine Schiøth and their seven children (aged 10 to 25). Hans Jacobsen, a master shoemaker, resided in the other half of the basement with his wife Ane Woltben, their five children (aged one to 12) and the cooper (bødkersvend) Peder Christensen.

The daughter married the military officer and later Defence Minister Carl on 16 November 1849.

Bierre's property was home to 44 residents in eight households at the 1850 census. His own household comprised 10 people. Hans Fjelsøe, a typographer, resided on the same floor with his wife Wilhelmine Fjelsøe and one maid. W. Unsgaard, who had become a widow, was still residing in the first-floor apartment to the right with her son and two maids. Hanne Sindberg and Hanne Lund, two unmarried women provided for by their families, shared the first-floor apartment to the left. Julius Bruhn, am officer with rank of first lieutenant, resided on the second floor to the right with his wife Georgine Rosenberg, the 16-year-old baroness Polyxene von Pechlin (daughter of Friedrich and Adelheid von Pechlin; later married to Erik Christian Hartvig Rosenørn-Lehn) and one maid. Thor Nicolai Petersen was still residing in the other second-floor apartment with his wife Caroline Petersen, his mother-in-law Martelene Schou, his sister-in-law Amandine Schou and two maids. Christine Rasmussen, who had now become a widow but continued her ghusband's shop, resided in one half of the basement with her four daughters (aged 19 to 32). Hans Jacobsen, the master shoemaker from the 1840 census, was still residing in the other half of the basement with his large family.

=== 1860 census ===
Bierre's brewery closed in the 1850s. The old craft breweries in the city centre were not able to compete with the new industrial breweries that were constructed outside the city, such as Carlsberg in Valby, Tvedes Bryggeri on Vesterbrogade and Rabeshave in Christianshavn. The premises was subsequently for a while used as a malt house.

The property was home to 53 residents at the 1860 census. Niels Andreasen, a manufacturer of malt (malthjører), resided on the ground floor with his wife Johanne Andreasen, their 24-year-old daughter Andrea Andreasen and two male caretakers. Hans Johanes Rønne, a grocer (hørkræmmer) resided in the other ground-floor apartment with his wife Thora Marie Rønne, their three daughters (aged one to nine), a grocer (hørkræmmersvend), a grocer's apprentice (jørkræmmerlærling), a clerk, and two maids. Frederik Sophus Willemann. an auctionholder, resided in one of the first-floor apartments with his wife Thora Nathalia Willemann, their eight children (aged one to 17) and two maids. Christian Ludvig Høpfner. a goldsmith, resided in the other first-floor apartment with his wife Elisabeth Høpfner and three of their children (aged 13 to 28). Thor Nicolai Petersen, now with title of kancelliråd, was still residing on the first floor with his wife his wife, their 12-year-old son Thor Petersen, his sister-in-law, a housekeeper and a maid. Henrik Wilhelm Reinwaldt, a master book binder, resided in the other second-floor apartment with his wife Johanne Susanne Reinwaldt, their two sons (aged zero and 13), his mother-in-law Johanne Cathrine Schiller and one maid. Jens Petersen, a haulier resided on the third floor with one male servant. Jørgen Jørgensen, another man involved in the operation of the malting dacility (maltføringsbestyrer), resided in the basement with his wife, their two children (aged six and 11), one lodger and two workmen.

=== 1880 census ===
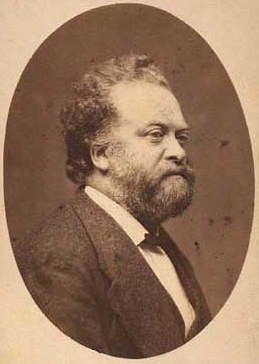
Edvard Valdemar Harboe 1862 by Grundtvig

The property was home to 34 residents at the time of the 1880 census. Otto Frederik Rohde, a master baker, resided on the ground floor to the right with his wife Flora Constantia Theresia Rohde (née Wedel), their six children (aged two to 16), a maid (widow) with her 12-year-old daughter, a baker (bagerkarl), three baker's apprentices and a floor clerk. The eld4est son Otto Rohde would later become a theatre director. Jens Petersen, a haulier, resided on the ground floor to the left with his wife Maren Petersen (née Hansdatter) and their 15-yearold son Andreas Christian Petersen. Peter Ludvig Harboe, a manufacturer of nails and louvers, resided on the first floor to the right with his wife Camilla Nathalie Harboe (née Hansen), a housekeeper and a maid. Carl Ferdinand Wulff, a businessman (grosserer), resided alone in the first-floor apartment to the left. Andreas Frederik Raasløff, a lawyer, resided on the second floor to the right with his son Emil Frederik Constantin Raasløff, his daughter-in-law Theodora Vilhelmine Agnete Raasløff (née Frederiksen) and one maid. Edvard Valdemar Harboe, a photographer, resided alone in the second-floor apartment to the left. Lars Poulsen Kolding, a string retailer (and former carpenter at Orlogsværftet), resided in the basement to the left with his wife Ane Sophie Kolding (née Schmidt) and their four children (aged seven to 15).

=== 20th and 21st centuries ===
The property was at some point acquired by Michael Goldschmidt through his property company Atlas A/S. In February 2007, he sold Atlas A/S to Icelandic company Stodir (later Landic Property). In 2009, during the 2008–2011 Icelandic financial crisis, Landic Properties was declared in suspension of payments and went into liquidation. In October 2009, Kompagnistræde 21 was part of a portfolio of 31 former Atlas A/S properties sold for DKK 2 billions to Jeudan.

== Architecture ==
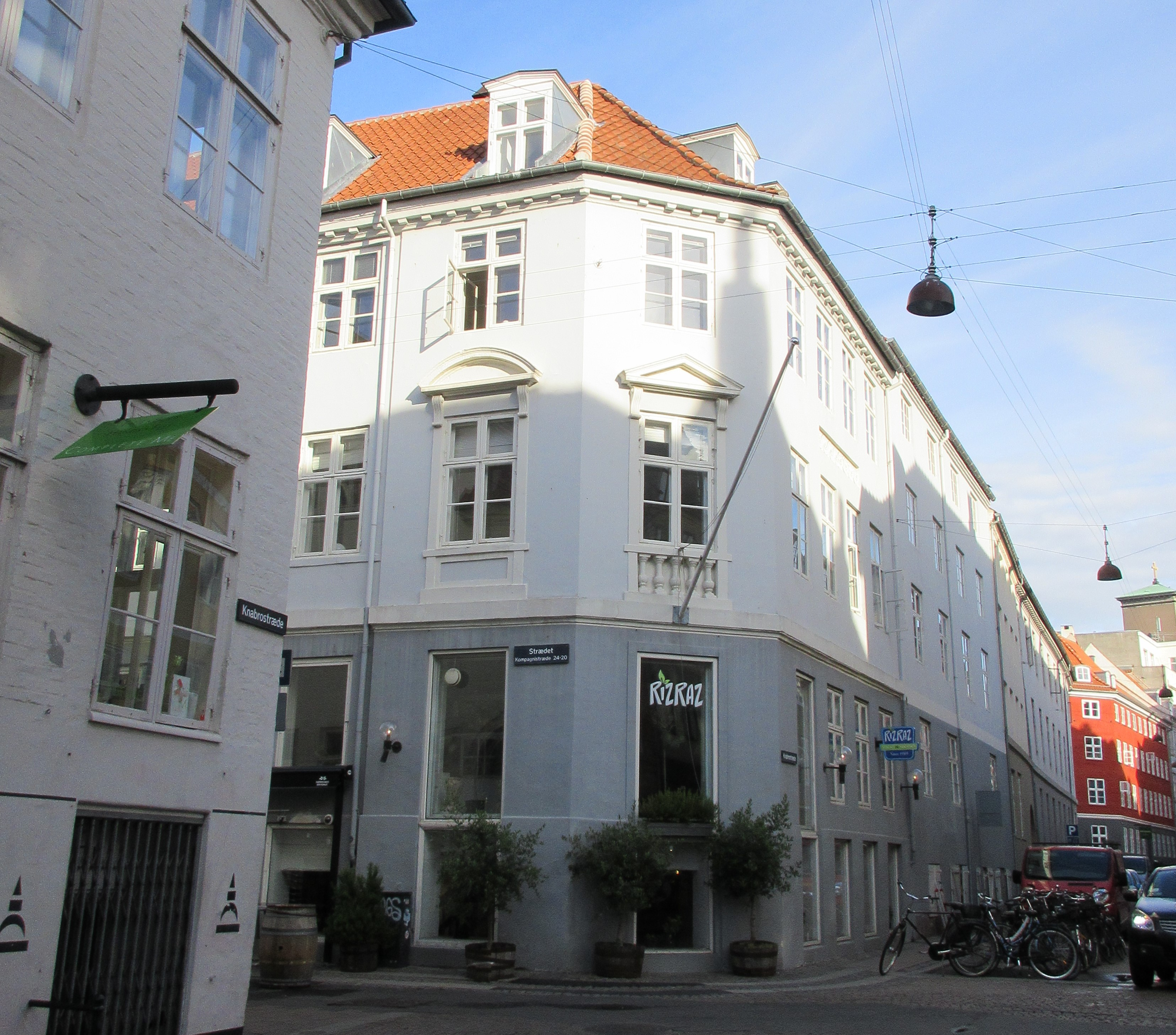
The building in 2016-

Kompagnistræde 20 is a corner building constructed with three storeys above a walk-out basement. The building has a 12-bays-long facade towards Kompagnistræde, a four-bays-long facade towards Knabrostræde and a one-bay-long chamfered corner. The chamfered corner bay was dictated for all corner buildings by Jørgen Henrich Rawert's and Peter Meyn's guidelines for the rebuilding of the city after the fire so that the fire department's long ladder companies could navigate the streets more easily. The plastered and white-painted facade is finished with a cornice band above the ground floor and a modillioned cornice. A two-bay, arched gateway is located in the fourth and fifth bay towards Kompagnistræde. The first-floor windows of the slightly projecting sixth and 12th bay are topped by segmental pediments. The first-floor corner window is topped by a triangular pediment and is also accented with a blind balustrade underneath it. The first-floor windows of the seventh to 11th bay towards Kompagnistræde are visually brought together by a sill course. The second-floor windows of the eighth to 10th bay in Kompagnistræde and the two central ones towards Knabrostræde are topped by friezes with wave schroll ornamentation. The pitched red tile roof features seven dormer windows towards Kompagnistræde and two dormer windows towards Knabrostræde. The roof ridge is pierced by a single chimney.

The side wing is an L-shaped three-storey building, with four bays towards Kompagnistræde and two bays towards the courtyard. It is attached to an L-shaped former warehouse in the courtyard. The former warehouse has a three-bays-logn west wing, a three-bays-long north wing and a canted corner. The west wing is crowned by a gabled wall dormer with the remains of a pulley. Knabrostræde 18 is also a former warehouse, dating from 1796. Its fourth floor was added in 1829.

== Today ==
The restaurant Riz Raz occupies the ground floor of the building. The crafts shop Dansk Håndværk is located in the basement. The upper floors are rented out as office space.
