= Olivia Levison =

Danish author and writer (1847–1894)

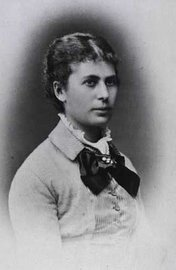
Olivia Levison

Olivia Levison (30 June 1847 – 11 April 1894) was a Danish author and writer.

== Biography ==
Born as Olivia Wilhelmine Rosalia Levison on 30 June 1847, in Copenhagen, Denmark, Olivia Levison was the daughter of Frederikke V. Bendix and Esaias Levison. She did not receive any formal education but she was "cultured and well versed in languages". Through her brother she became acquainted with Georg Brandes, a noted Danish critic and scholar, who was associated with a Scandinavian culture movement known as "Modern Breakthrough".

In August 1888 she married the Swedish music critic H. G. J. Sandström, and stayed with him at Stockholm. After her divorce in 1891, she returned to and settled in Copenhagen.

During the 1880s, she actively participated in morality debates and well-articulated her position. She extensively wrote on sexual morals in the form of journalistic texts under the pseudonym Silvia Bennet. Her important literary works include Min første Bog (1876), Gjæringstid (1881) and Konsulinden (1887).

She died on 11 April 1894 in Copenhagen, Denmark.
