= Esaias Levison =

Danish educator and author

- Born: April 22, 1803; Copenhagen, Denmark
- Died: March 23, 1891 (aged 87); Copenhagen, Denmark
- Resting place: Møllegade Jewish Cemetery
- Spouse: Frederikke Bendix (m. 1831)
- Children: Olivia Levison

Esaias Levison (April 22, 1803 – March 23, 1891) was a Danish educator and author.

== Biography ==
Esaias Levison was born into a Jewish family in Copenhagen in 1803. He received a Bachelor of Arts degree from the University of Copenhagen in 1823. The following year, Levison began working as a tutor at a Jewish school in Copenhagen, a position he held until two years before his death.

Over his career, Levison authored several religious and educational works, including a Jewish prayer book containing Hebrew text alongside a Danish translation (1833). He also translated Edward Bulwer-Lytton's novel Paul Clifford into Danish. From 1837 to 1838, he served as co-editor of the Danish political periodical Borgervennen, to which he contributed several articles.

The University of Kiel awarded him an honorary Ph.D. degree in 1837.

== Selected publications ==
- Kortfattet Forklaring over Lærebogen i Religionen for Ungdommen af den Mosaiske Troesbekjendelse. Copenhagen: H. I. Bings Forlag. 1825.
- Bibelske Fortællinger. Copenhagen: L. J. Jacobsen. 1827.
- Israelitisk Bønnebog paa Hebraisk og Dansk. 1833.
- Paul Clifford. En Fortælling af E. L Bulwer. Copenhagen. 1834.
