= Hardenack Otto Conrad Zinck =

German-Danish composer

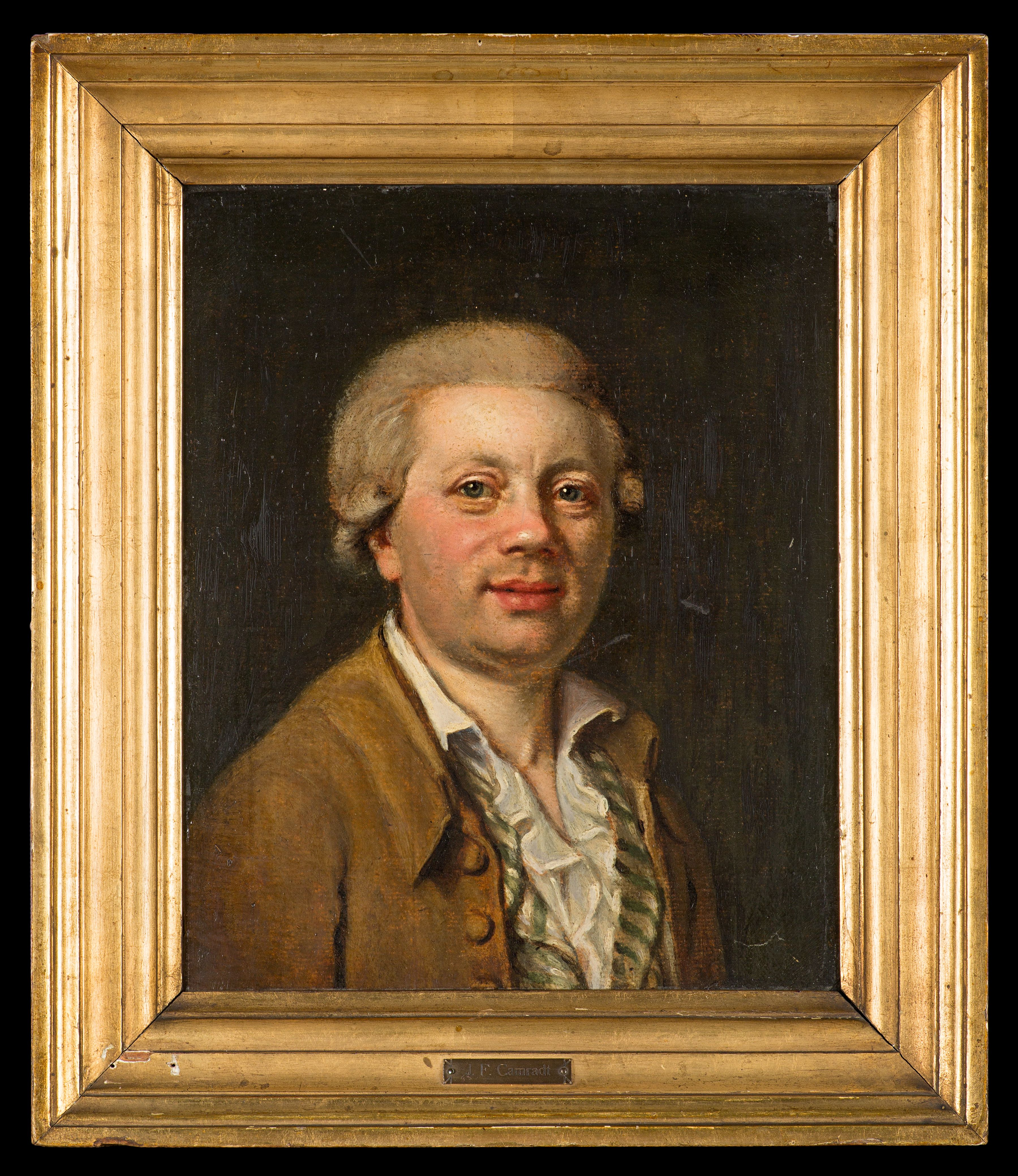
Hardenack Otto Conrad Zinck

Hardenack Otto Conrad Zinck (also: Hartenack; 2 July 1746 in Husum – 15 February 1832 in Copenhagen) was a German-Danish composer.

== Early years ==
At the age of 5, the young Otto performed for King Frederick V of Denmark, and before he turned 12 his father had taught him to play violin, flute and piano. Until he was 19, he attended Latin school in Husum, Germany and traveled to Hamburg around the age of 21–22 where he sang in a church choir. He studied music, and sang under the guidance of music director Carl Philipp Emanuel Bach, who became his idol.

=== Hamburg 1767 ===
Zinck participated in the musical life, becoming an important flute player in Hamburg and composing flute pieces. In 1774–76 he gave subscription concerts, a few at a time, at which large vocal concerts were held.

He also tutored, and married his pupil Susanne Elisabeth Pontet (born in 1745 of French origin) on 27 September 1774. On 17 December 1777, the coupe were employed at the chapel of Mecklenburg-Schwerin in Ludwigslust, where Zinck became flutist, and his wife a soprano singer. Here he composed six piano sonatas (1782).

=== Copenhagen 1786 ===
In September 1786, Zinck and his wife traveled to Copenhagen, where they performed at the royal court and at the theater, both places with success. On 15 September 1787, Zinck was hired as accompanist at the Royal Chapel, a position which included a role as singing instructor at the theater.

He was hired at about the same time as the new conductor J.A.P. Schulz in October that same year, and began forming a standing choir. As accompanist he directed the piano together with the concert master whenever the conductor Schultz was not present. As his only attempt at dramatic art, he composed the music for P.A. Heiberg’s play Selim and Mirza (1790), but not to any acclaim. He later became organist at the Church of Our Saviour from 1789 to 1801.

=== Music teacher at Blaagaard Seminarium ===
At the time, ideas about the power of music to educate the public and promote cultural values were popular, with Schulz as a pivotal figure in the movement. This required spreading and improvement singing in schools and churches. To this end, and at Schulz’ recommendation, Zinck became music teacher at the new teachers’ college at Blaagaard in 1791, the first such college in Denmark. He had residence at Blaagaard, but moved with the school to Jonstrup in 1808 where he worked until 1811.

In the beginning, Zinck's work was difficult due to the lack of materials, the fact that his Danish was poor, and that the pupils were no less difficult than the choir members he previously had instructed. After some years, however, it is said that people gathered in the evenings on Nørrebro to hear the pupils sing in harmony in the garden.

In 1798, he started a choir organization together with his wife, his two daughters and his oldest son Ludvig, himself a composer. Four choirs were formed, one male and three female. All the members, around 50, joined for two trial concerts, which led to the creation of the Singing Institute for the Youth of Copenhagen (Danish: Almindeligt syngeinstitut for Kjøbenhavns Ungdom (1799)). As its principal, Zinck published the text The Northern Harp (German: Die nördliche Harfe) in 1801. Due to lack of funding, the institute gradually died down.

== Book of choral music ==
Zinck’s most important contribution to church and popular singing was his book of choral music (Danish: Koralbog) from 1801, but which had lain dormant for a while. It was introduced in all Danish churches and was used for half a century, with some melodies having even more enduring popularity.

Zinck also published Compositions for Song and Piano (Danish: Kompositioner for Sangen og Klaveret) which was published in serials. He also edited melodies for O. D. Lütken's song book for use at home and in school, containing about 20 of Zinck’s melodies. He also wrote a large number of compositions for certain occasions, intended to be performed by the guests present at such events.

When his dear college was moved to Jonstrup in 1809, Zinck was appointed professor and continued his work for another two years. He defended his views on the use of song in various periodicals. All his good intentions were united in the use of the word harmony: Harmony in art, in human feelings, i the Fatherland, in the entire Universe. However, his theoretical approach at times got in the way for his practical teaching of singing.

After 20 years at the theater, Zinck held concerts with great attendance. His work as singing instructor consisted in helping the opera singers learn their solo parts, previously working with Michel Angelo Potenza to train aspiring singers – mentioning Frydeldahl and Knudsen as his students. However, this did not suit him well. In 1817, his son Ludvig took over his position as lead singing instructor. In spite of his age of 71, Zinck still remained employed, working on his own to further music and singing in general.

== Later years ==
Zinck retired on 23 June 1821, at the age of 74. As an old man, he preserved his love for the arts. He died in Copenhagen on 15 February 1832, followed by his wife on 19 April that year. Zinck was great-grandfather to Thomas Laub, who 100 years later would initiate a renewal of church singing in Denmark in the spirit of the Lutheran age.

== Selected works ==
- Nu kom der bud fra englekor (Kingo)
- Nu rinder solen op af østerlide (Kingo)
- Langt højere bjerge så vide på jord (Grundtvig)

== See also ==
- List of Danish composers
