= Jacob Jacobsen Dampe =

Danish theologian and politician

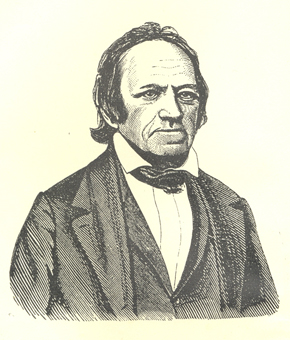
- Jacob Jacobsen Dampe
- Born: 10 January 1790
- Died: 22 December 1867 (aged 77)
- Occupations: Theologian, and politician activist

Jacob Jacobsen Dampe often referred to in Danish as J.J. Dampe or Dr. Dampe (born 10 January 1790 in Copenhagen; died 22 December 1867 in Copenhagen) was a Danish theologian, scholar, and politician activist.

In 1820 Dampe was sentenced to death because he had demanded the abolition of the Absolute monarchy and the introduction of a free constitution. His sentence was however changed to exile and he was held in a prison called "the Balloon" on the islet Fredriksø, part of the Ertholmene islands north of Bornholm. In 1840, after the abolition of exile as a form of punishment, he was placed under house arrest in Bornholm. He was granted amnesty in 1848 under the new King Frederick VII of Denmark. In 1849 the Constitution of Denmark was introduced.

== Literature ==
- J. J. Dampe: Fortælling om mit fængsel i haardeste grad i tyve aar, og min forviisning i syv aar, lidelser, mig tilføiede formedelst min lære om folkets ret. Salomon, København 1858 (Reprint: Dansk Kautionsforskring, København 1951).
- Michael Helm: Det kvalte demokrati. Guldalderens glemte systemkritikerne. Gyldendal, København 1986, ISBN 87-01-40082-7.
- Teddy Petersen (Hrsg.): Skrivefrækhed. In: Studier i Skandinavistik. Vol. 3, 1989, ZDB-ID 1033500-6, pp. 75–174.
- Article in Dansk biografisk leksikon (Danish)
