= Bernardo Giustiniani =

Bernardo Giustiniani (6 January 1408 – 10 March 1489) was a Renaissance humanist and diplomat of the Republic of Venice.

Giustiniani held numerous political offices in Venice over his long career, but he made his name as a diplomat. He was elected ambassador ten times, actually going abroad nine times. His first embassy was to the coronation of the Holy Roman Emperor, Frederick III, in Rome in 1452. He was sent to Naples in 1458 and again in 1470. In 1461–1462, he led a failed embassy to France. He led two embassies to congratulate a newly elected pope: Pius II (1462–1463) and Sixtus IV (1471–1472). He was also sent to Paul II in 1466. His final embassies involved local states, Ferrara in 1473 and Milan in 1485. Although he did not leave Venice, he engaged in diplomacy by letter before, during and after the War of Ferrara (1482–1484). A major theme of his embassies was the crusade against the Ottoman Empire, which he discussed with the emperor, the kings of Naples and France and popes Pius and Sixtus.

A learned man, Giustiniani translated classics, dabbled in poetry and wrote a history of Venice, as well as hagiography. Praised by contemproaries for his oratorical skills, a large number of his speeches are preserved, as well as much of his correspondence.

== Life ==
=== Early life and family ===
Giustiniani was born in Venice on 6 January 1408. His father was Leonardo Giustiniani and his mother Lucrezia di Bernardo Da Mula. In Venice, he studied under Cristoforo de Scarpis in 1416 and 1418–1420 and learned Latin, Greek and moral philosophy from Francesco Filelfo in 1417–1419. He went to Verona to study under Guarino Guarini, but had to leave later that year to escape the plague. He "perhaps studied arts and law" at the University of Padua.

In 1427, Giustiniani joined the Great Council. In 1432–1433, he stayed in Udine, where his father was governor. In 1433, he married Elisabetta di Giovanni Priuli. They had four sons and three daughters. Their daughter Orsa was the mother of the humanist Marco Dandolo.

Giustiniani had major business interests, but these are only barely visible in the surviving records. In 1442, he was named a savio agli Ordini. In 1443, he met and was deeply moved by Bernardino da Siena.

=== Royal embassies ===
On 5 January 1452, he was one of the ambassadors dispatched to Rome to greet Frederick III when he travelled to Italy to be crowned Holy Roman Emperor. He urged the emperor to lead an anti-Ottoman crusade. The fall of Constantinople to the Turks (1453) adversely affected his commercial interests and he opposed Venice's treaty with the sultan (1454). Thereafter he staunchly advocated a more aggressive Venetian policy.

Between 1456 and 1462, Giustiniani served ten (non-continuous) terms as savio of the Terraferma. In 1457, he was one of the ducal electors of Pasquale Malipiero. In 1458, he led an embassy to King Ferdinand I of Naples, arriving at Andria on 12 December. His main purpose was to mediate an accord between the king and the rebellious prince of Taranto, Giovanni Antonio Orsini del Balzo, an ally of Venice. An accord was reached in March 1459.

In 1459–1460, Giustiniani was a member of the Council of Ten. In 1460, he used his influence to procure a teaching position for Gianmario Filelfo in the School of Saint Mark. When Filelfo left in 1461, he successfully advocated giving the chair to George of Trebizond. When it was vacant again in 1468, he advocated for Giorgio Merula.

In October 1461, Giustiniani and Paolo Barbo were sent as ambassadors to King Louis XI of France. They stopped in Milan on the way to meet Duke Francesco Sforza. They arrived in Tours in December. Their goal was to sound out Louis's policy regarding the Republic of Genoa and the Kingdom of Naples, convey to him Venice's neutrality in any case and discuss the anti-Ottoman crusade. They celebrated Epiphany with Louis, who knighted Giustiniani. The mission, however, was a failure. Louis left Tours without informing the ambassadors, who were authorized in February 1462 to return to Venice. Before doing so, they visited Paris, where Giustiniani's reputation as a humanist preceded them. A delegation from the University of Paris led by Giovanni Giulierio met them and Giulierio delivered a speech praising Venice. Giustiniani's responded with one of his most famous speeches, addressed to the university.

=== Roman embassies ===
Giustiniani was back in Venice in May 1462, in time to be one of the electors of Cristoforo Moro and appointed to the Council of Ten. On 29 October 1462, he left for Rome as ambassador to Pius II with the stated goal of securing an accord between the pope and Sigismondo Malatesta "for the peace and quiet of all Italy", but also to discuss the anti-Ottoman crusade. Travelling overland, he found the pope taking to the waters at Petriolo on 8 November and then followed him to Todi. Peace with Malatesta was signed on 24 July 1463. Giustiniani urged the pope to bring an end to the Hungarian succession war so that Hungary could participate in the crusade. He also discussed crusade financing. In November, personal matters required his return to Venice. He was replaced by Ludovico Foscarini.

In 1463, Giustiniani was elected to the Minor Council. In 1464, he was elected a savio grande. In October, he was selected as one of the ambassadors to congratulate the newly elected Pope Paul II. He was released, however, for personal reasons. In 1464–1465, he served a term as avogador di comun. He was re-elected as ambassador to the papacy in 1465. Shipwrecked off Rimini en route, he lost all his baggage and requested another release. The republic opted instead to compensate him and order him on to Rome, where he finally arrived in January 1466. He was seeking permission for Venice to increase taxes on clergy. His mission ended in failure, as he was highly critical of papal spending priorities. He had returned to Venice by October, when he was elected to the Council of Ten.

=== Aging savio grande ===
In 1467, Giustiniani was again elected a savio grande. In May, he was elected captain of Padua, where Ludovico Foscarini was serving as podestà. In October 1468, he became provveditore of the troops in Lombardy, but he only lasted a month. In 1469, he was elected to the Council of Ten. In 1469–1470, he served a term as a savio grande. Thereafter, he was elected to twenty-four further terms, at least one in every single year down to 1488. These kept him in Venice and after 1477, combined with his advanced age, reduced his diplomatic travels.

In June 1470, Giustiniani was elected ambassador to Naples to repair the damage done by the previous ambassador, Filippo Correr. He was successful and the Treaty of Lodi was renewed on 22 December. In 1470–1471, he served overlapping terms on the Council of Ten and as a savio grande. In July 1471, when Bartolomeo Memmo was hanged for conspiring to kill the doge, Giustiniani was the only one of the Council of Ten to speak against the sentence, on the grounds that Memmo was a youth of twenty and had not meant what he said.

In July 1471, Giustiniani was elected to head the delegation to congratulate the newly elected Pope Sixtus IV. The other ambassadors were Triadano Gritti, Andrea Leoni and Marco Corner. They arrived in Rome at the end of November, their main goal being to resuscitate the anti-Ottoman crusade, which had gained urgency in Venice with the Ottomans threatening Friuli. They were recalled in March 1472 in favour of a regular ambassador.

In 1472–1473, Giustiniani sat on the Minor Council. In the latter year, he was one of the electors of Doge Nicolò Marcello. In October 1473, Giustiniani and Marco Barbarigo were sent as ambassadors to the Duchy of Ferrara to deal with the counterfeiting of Venetian coins. In 1474, he was an elector at the election of Doge Pietro Mocenigo. On 17 December, he was named a Procurator of Saint Mark for life to replace Mocenigo. On 21 December, he was present when the formal canonization process was opened for his uncle, Lorenzo Giustiniani, the first patriarch of Venice.

In 1476, Giustiniani was one of the revisers of the ducal oath of office and one of the electors of Andrea Vendramin. In November 1477, he was one of three provveditori sent to Friuli to inspect its defences. In 1478, he was a member of the Minor Council and an elector at the election of Doge Giovanni Mocenigo.

=== War of Ferrara and later years ===
There is conflicting testimony about Giustiniani's role in the outbreak of the War of Ferrara in May 1482. According to Pietro Giustiniani, he was the spokesman for war against the opposition of Doge Giovanni Mocenigo, but this is not supported by the writings of Domenico Malipiero. In December, the pope withdrew his support for Venice. In letters to Sixtus IV in January and March 1483, Giustiniani defended Venice's actions as a just war. In May 1483, he wrote to the Venetian cardinals appealing to their patriotism. The war ended in 1484. In January 1485, he appealed without success to Sixtus's successor, Innocent VIII, to lift the interdict against Venice.

Giustiniani's last diplomatic post was a brief spell as ambassador to the Duchy of Milan in May 1485. He was one of the ducal electors in 1485 (Marco Barbarigo) and 1486. In the latter election, he and Agostino Barbarigo were the main candidates. On the fifth ballot, he voted for Barbarigo, ending the stalemate.

Giustiniani made his last will on 5 March 1489 and died on 10 March.

== Works ==
Titlepage of the 1534 edition of Giustiniani's history of Venice, printed by Antonio Brucioli

=== Poetry ===
Giustiniani's only known poetry dates to his stay in Verona in 1429. He translated into Latin some lines of Homer and wrote his own Latin poem in ninety-seven lines, Pacis congratulatio inter Venetos et Philippum Mariam ad ducem Venetum, a celebration of the peace treaty of April 1428 ending the war between the Visconti and Venice. It was dedicated to Doge Francesco Foscari. In addition to these, there are references to some tercets in honour of Jacopo Zeno, but they do not survive.

=== Translations ===
Not long after his forays into poetry, Giustiniani translated Isocrates' To Nikokles from Greek into Latin under the title Isocratis sermo de regno ad Nicoclem regem, dedicating it to Ludovico III Gonzaga. The translation is rather free, but was praised by Guarino, by Ambrogio Traversari in a letter to Giustiniani's father and by Gonzaga himself in a letter of thanks to Giustiniani dated 9 January 1432.

=== Speeches and letters ===
Many of Giustiniani's speeches and letters were collected and published under the title Orationes et epistolae in 1493. He was especially admired by his contemporary for his oratory. Among the speeches (orationes) included are:

- Oratio ad Fridericum III imperatorem ad coronas et nuptias Romam proficiscentem (5 January 1452, Rome)
- Oratio ad Pium pontificem (December 1458, Rome, during a stop on his embassy to Naples)
- Oratio ad serenissimum regem Ferdinandum Siciliae regem in legatione habita (28 December 1458, Naples)
- Oratio ad serenissimum regem Ferdinandum pro discessione (1 August 1459, Naples)
- Oratio ad serenissimum regem Franciae Ludovicum (6 January 1462, Tours)
- Oratio responsiva ad Universitatem Parisiensem (1462, Paris)
- Oratio ad Pium summum pontificem in consistorium (1463, Todi?)
- Oratio habita apud Paulum secundum summum pontificem (30 January 1466, Rome)
- Oratio habita apud Sixtum IV pontificem maximum (2 December 1471, Rome)

One speech not included in the collection is the eulogy for Doge Francesco Foscari, Oratio funebris habita in obitu Francisci Fuscari ducis.

At least 77 letters by and to Giustiniani have been preserved. He corresponded the humanists Francesco Filelfo, Ludovico Foscarini, George of Trebizond, Ambrogio Traversari, Jacopo Zeno, Sebastiano Bursa, Pietro Dolfin, Girolamo Guarini and Pietro Perleone. In the autumn of 1459, during the Diet of Mantua, he was in correspondence with Pope Pius II concerning the anti-Ottoman crusade and the canonization of Lorenzo Giustiniani. In 1472, at the end of his embassy to Sixtus IV, he received from the pope a letter, Dilecto filio Bernardo Iustiniano, praising his oratorical skills. His diplomatic correspondence concerning the War of Ferrara consists of:

- Epistola pro Republica Veneta ad Sixtum IV summum pontificem, to Sixtus IV (24 January 1482)
- Ad Sixtum IV pontificem maximum responsio, to Sixtus IV (12 January 1483)
- Responsio ad eundem summum pontificem, to Sixtus IV (15 March 1483)
- Responsio ad Sacrum Collegium cardinalium, to the cardinals (28 May 1483)
- Epistola ad Innocentium octavum pontificem maximum, to Innocent VIII (13 January 1485)

=== History and biography ===
Giustiniani wrote three works of history and biography: Vita beati Laurentii Iustiniani Venetiarum protopatriarchae (Life of Holy Lorenzo), De origine urbis Venetiarum rebusque gestis a Venetis libri XV (History of the Origin of Venice) and De divi Marci evangelistae vita, translatione, et sepulturae loco (Life of Saint Mark).

==== Life of Holy Lorenzo ====
The first, Vita beati Laurentii Iustiniani Venetiarum protopatriarchae, is a life of his uncle, the Patriarch Lorenzo. It was written in 1471–1474 and printed in 1475. It consists of a prologue and twelve chapters: the first four on Lorenzo's virtues, the next four on his episcopate, then a chapter on his sayings and finally three chapters on his death and burial. The work served as an incitement to his canonization process.

==== History of the Origin of Venice ====
First page of De origine urbis Venetiarum, 1492 edition

Following his retirement from active diplomacy in 1485, Giustiniani prepared for publication a history of Venice, De origine urbis Venetiarum rebusque gestis a Venetis libri XV, which he originally wrote in 1477–1481. An autograph manuscript still exists, MS Cicogna 1809 in the library of the Museo Correr. This contains a working draft heavily annotated in the margins and a fuller text prepared for publication by his son Lorenzo and Domenico Morosini.

The final text, revised in accordance with his will by Benedetto Brugnoli and Giovanni Calfurnio, was printed posthumously in 1492 by Bernardino Benali. The work had a second printing in 1534. The latest edition was that by Johann Georg Graevius from 1722. An Italian translation, Historia dell’origine di Vinegia et delle cose fatte da Venitiani, by Lodovico Domenichi appeared in 1545, edited by Bernardino Bindoni. Another Italian translation by Pietro Dusinello appeared in 1608.

De origine urbis Venetiarum covers the history of Venice from its foundation until the dogeship of Agnello Parteciaco (r. 811–827) in fifteen books. Giustiniani relies on classical sources, as well as contemporary humanists Flavio Biondo and Lorenzo Valla. It is the first humanist history of Venice, and also "the most accomplished and reliable". Giustiniani is a critical historian, who compares contradictory accounts to seaparate fact from falsehood and analyzes accounts for their verisimilitude.

==== Life of Saint Mark ====
After finishing De origine urbis Venetiarum, Giustiniani wrote three short works on Saint Mark, known collectively as De divi Marci evangelistae vita, translatione, et sepulturae loco. The three short works cover Mark's life, the transfer of his relics to Venice and his continued presence there through his shrine church, where his bones are hidden.

Giustiniani intended to produce two further biographies, of his father and his uncle Marco, but these were never written.

== Dedications ==
Four contemporary works were dedicated to Giustiniani. The humanist Giovanni Jacopo Cane dedicated his De iniuriis et damno dato (Padua, 1472/3) and Tractatus repressalearum (Pavia, 1479) to him. At Brescia in 1474, Justinianus Luzagus dedicated an edition of the Iliad to him. Later, Raffaele Regio dedicated to him his In Eloquentium Panegyricus.

== Bibliography ==
- Beverley, Tessa (1999). Venetian Ambassadors, 1454–94: An Italian Elite (PDF) (PhD dissertation). University of Warwick.
- King, Margaret L. (1985). Venetian Humanism in an Age of Patrician Dominance. Princeton University Press.
- Labalme, Patricia H. (1969). Bernardo Giustiniani: A Venetian of the Quattrocento. Edizioni di Storia e Letteratura.
- Marin, Şerban (2019). "Some Notes about Bernardo Giustiniani's De origine urbis Venetiarum". Revista Arhivelor. 96 (1–2): 73–100.
- Monfasani, John (1989). "Bernardo Giustiniani and Alfonso de Palencia: Their Hands and Some New Humanist Texts and Translations". Scriptorium. 43 (2): 223–238. doi:10.3406/scrip.1989.1541.
- Mori, Giuliano (2024). Historical Truth in Fifteenth-Century Italy: Verisimilitude and Factuality in the Humanist Debate. Oxford University Press.
- Pistilli, Gino (2001). "Giustinian, Bernardo". Dizionario Biografico degli Italiani (in Italian). Vol. 57: Giulini–Gonzaga. Rome: Istituto dell'Enciclopedia Italiana. ISBN 978-88-12-00032-6.
- Rothkamm, Jan, ed. (2016). Three Speeches by Venetian Ambassadors, 1433–1486: Francesco Barbaro, Ad Sigismundum Caesarem; Bernardo Giustinian, Ad universitatem Parisiensem; Ermolao Barbaro, Ad Federicum / Ad Maximilianum regem Romanorum. Harrassowitz Verlag.
