= Labalme (surname) =

Labalme is a surname. Notable people with the surname include:

- George Labalme Jr. (1927–2016), American soldier, an industrial designer, and philanthropist
- Patricia Hochschild Labalme (1927–2002), American historian
- Victoria Labalme, American performing artist
