= Caroline Wilby Prize =

The Caroline I. Wilby Prize was founded in 1897 in memory of Caroline I. Wilby, by her friends and former students. The prize is given annually to the student who has produced the best original work within any of the departments of Radcliffe College, Cambridge in Massachusetts. The prize is only awarded if a dissertation or thesis is considered worthy enough.

The prize was given for the first time in 1899 to Kate Oelzner Petersen, for her thesis On the Sources of the Nonne Prestes Tale. Other winners include the medievalist Lucy Allen Paton (1865-1951), for her thesis Morgain, la fée, a study in the fairy mythology of the middle ages, the historian Grace Lee Nute (1895-1990) for her thesis American foreign commerce (1825-1850) and also the astronomer Dorrit Hoffleit (1907-2007), for her thesis On the Spectroscopic Determination of Absolute Magnitudes…. Florence Shirley Patterson Jones's dissertation, Surface photometry of external galaxies won the Wilby Prize in 1941.

== Recipients ==
Year	Recipient	Title
1899	Kate Oelzner Petersen	On the Sources of the Nonne Prestes Tale in libraries (WorldCat catalog)
1900	Lucy Allen Paton	Studies in the fairy mythology of Arthurian romance in libraries (WorldCat catalog)
1904	Belva Mary Herron	Progress of Labor Organization among Women in libraries (WorldCat catalog)
	Caroline Strong	Tail-Rhyme Strophe in English Poetry
1905	Eleanor Harris Rowland	Aesthetics of the Repetition of Visual Space Forms in libraries (WorldCat catalog)
1906	Frances Hall Rousmaniere	Certainty and attention in libraries (WorldCat catalog)
1907	Mabel Ellery Adams	An Inquiry into the Condition of one hundred deaf persons who have been pupils at the Horace Mann School in Boston
1909	Kate Fairbanks Puffer	Interrelations of psychophysical rhythmical processes in libraries (WorldCat catalog)
1910	Maud Bassett Gorham	The traditions of restoration comedy in the works of Richardson, Fielding & Smollett in libraries (WorldCat catalog)
1911	Ruth Holden	Reduction and Reversion in the North American Salicales in libraries (WorldCat catalog)
1912	Charlotte Farrington Babcock	A study of the metrical use of the inflectional e in Middle English, with particular reference to Chaucer and Lydgate in libraries (WorldCat catalog)
1913	Elizabeth Church	The Gothic romance : its origins and development in libraries (WorldCat catalog)
1915	Evelyn Spring	Quo Modo Aeschylus in Tragoediis Suis Res Antecedentis Exposuerit: A study of exposition in Greek tragedy in libraries (WorldCat catalog)
1916	Frances Isabella Hyams	A brief history of the American theatre : with especial reference to the eighteenth century, supplemented by collections toward a bibliography before 1900 in libraries (WorldCat catalog)
1917	Caroline Frances Tupper	Oliver Goldsmith as a Critic in libraries (WorldCat catalog)
1918	Olive B. White	The Verse Translations of John Dryden
1919	Marian Irwin	Effect of Electrolytes and Non-electrolytes on Organisms in Relation to Sensory Stimulation and Respiration in libraries (WorldCat catalog)
	Nellie Gertrude Chase	Studies in allegory in English literature of the eighteenth century in libraries (WorldCat catalog)
1920	Matilda Moldenhauer Brooks	Quantitative studies on the respiration of Bacillus subtilis (Ehrenberg) Cohn in libraries (WorldCat catalog)
	Bernice V Brown	Status of armed merchantmen in libraries (WorldCat catalog)
1921	Grace Lee Nute	American foreign commerce (1825-1850) in libraries (WorldCat catalog)
1922	Hannah G. Roach	Sectionalism in American Politics from the Reconstruction Period to 1890
1923	Mary Ballantine Hume Eva Matthews Sanford	(shared prize)
1924	Cecilia H. Payne	Ionization in the Atmosphere of the Hotter Stars
1926	Olive B. White Eleanor Lansing Dulles	The Background of English Renaissance in 15th Century Oxford The French Franc Since the War (shared prize)
1928	Marine Leland	The damsel-errant in libraries (WorldCat catalog)
1929	Katherine Hartwell	The Influence of the Latin Church Father, Lactantius, on the Works of John Milton
1930	Marjorie K. Carpenter	Greek Hymnography: A Study of the Christmas Hymn
1931	Mary Frances Williams	Contemporary German Architecture
1933	Gerda Richards Crosby	The Transformation of the Tory Party after 1780: A Study in Eighteenth-Century Party Politics
1934	Catherine E. Boyd	A Cistercian Nunnery in Italy in the 13th Century
1935	Marie L. Edel LaTourette Stockwell	The Relations Between Prose and Metrical Composition in Early Irish Narrative Literature The Dublin Theatre, 19637-1820 (shared prize)
1936	Sarah Margaret Cousins	
1937	Dorothy Kneeland Clark	Thomas Osborne, Earl of Danby, Lord Treasurer
1938	Dorrit Hoffleit	On the spectroscopic determination of absolute magnitudes : with application to southern stars of types later than A in libraries (WorldCat catalog)
1939	Muriel E. Hidy	George Peabody, Merchant and Financier
1941	Florence Shirley Patterson	Surface photometry of external galaxies in libraries (WorldCat catalog)
1942	Sylvia Leah Berkman	Katherine Mansfield: A Study of Her Life and Work
1943	Dewilda Naramore	The Arriereban in Medieval France
1944	Cora C. Mason	The Ethics of Wealth in Early Greek Thought
1946	Evelyn Hodes Wilson	Antimalarials
1947	Alice Rose Stewart	The Imperial Policy of Sir John A. MacDonald, Canada's First Prime Minister
1948	Ilse Novak	On the Consistency of Goedel's Axioms for Class and Set Theory Relative to a Weaker Set of Axioms
1949	Cecelia Marie Kenyon	Conceptions of Human Nature in American Political Thought, 1630–1826
1950	Adrienne Rich	for her poetry; first undergraduate to win the Wilby
1951	Barbara Bell	A Study of Doppler and Damping Effects in the Solar Atmosphere
1952	Dorothy E. Bliss	Endocrine Control of Metabolism in the Decapod Crustacean, Gecarcinus Lateralis
1953	Margery W. Adams	Art in the 11th and 12th Centuries
1954	Isabel Emory Gamble	
1955	Judith N. Shklar	Fate and Futility: Two Themes in Contemporary Political Theory
1958	Patricia Hochschild Labalme	
1959	Roberta F. Colman	Studies on Dicarboxylic Amino Acids
1960	Rulan Chao Pian	Sung Dynasty Music Sources
1961	Jean H. Wheeler	Freedom and America
1962	Evelyn Ann Pottinger	Napoleon III and the German Crisis
