= Marco Giustiniani (died 1438) =

Venetian politician

Start of Leonardo's letter to Marco dedicating to him the vita Phocionis

Marco Giustiniani (died 1438) was a Venetian politician who served successively as podestà (governor) of Padua (1425), Bergamo (1428) and Verona (1433). His brother was Lorenzo Giustiniani, the first Patriarch of Venice.

Although Marco excelled his brother Leonardo during their Latin studies, he showed little interest in learning after he began his political career. In 1407, Giovanni Conversini wrote to Marco praising his brother's potential. When Leonardo translated the life of Phocion from Plutarch's Parallel Lives, he dedicated it to Marco.

During Marco's tenure in Padua in 1426, someone claimed to have found the bones of Livy, although this was later exposed as a fraud. Marco consolidated Venetian power along the Milanese frontier during the Wars in Lombardy, so that Duke Filippo Maria Visconti of Milan credited his intelligence with more effectiveness in war than 10,000 cavalry.

Marco died relatively young in 1438. A letter of condolence from Francesco Barbaro to Leonardo is dated 26 March 1438. Leonardo's son, Bernardo, intended to write biographies of his father and Marco, as he had of Lorenzo, but never got around to it.

== Works cited ==
- Labalme, Patricia H. (1969). Bernardo Giustiniani: A Venetian of the Quattrocento. Edizioni di Storia e Letteratura.
- Pistilli, Gino (2001). "Giustinian, Bernardo". Dizionario Biografico degli Italiani, Volume 57: Giulini–Gonzaga (in Italian). Rome: Istituto dell'Enciclopedia Italiana. ISBN 978-8-81200032-6.
