= Federico Cornaro =

Federico Cornaro or Federico Corner may refer to:

- Federico Cornaro (died 1382), Venetian statesman and entrepreneur
- Federico Cornaro (fl. 1419–1455), Venetian humanist
- Federico Cornaro (1415–1504), Venetian statesman
- Federico Cornaro (1531–1590), Roman Catholic cardinal
- Federico Baldissera Bartolomeo Cornaro (1579–1653), Roman Catholic cardinal
- Federico Cornaro (1638–1724), Venetian statesman and diplomat
