= Leonardo Giustiniani =

Leonardo Giustiniani (c. 1387 – 10 November 1446) was a Venetian patrician of the Giustiniani family. He served the Republic of Venice as a diplomat and as governor of the Patria del Friuli.

A Renaissance humanist, he made translations from ancient Greek into Latin. He wrote poetry in both Latin and vernacular Italian, some of which he set to music of his own composing. Many letters to and from him are preserved.

== Life ==
The date of Giustiniani's birth is uncertain, but is usually placed in or about the years 1383–1389. He was born in Venice. His parents were Bernardo Giustiniani and Quirina Quirini. His brothers were Lorenzo Giustiniani, the first patriarch of Venice, and Marco Giustiniani. He learned Latin and Greek alongside Marco under Giovanni Conversini. He later studied under Guarino Veronese and Gasparino Barzizza. In 1405, he married Lucrezia di Bernardo da Mula. Their son, Bernardo Giustiniani, became a famous historian.

Giustiniani was involved in the grain trade. He held his first political office in 1420, when he served as an avogador di comun. In 1421, he was provveditore generale in the Patria del Friuli. He served five terms as savio di Terraferma (1427, 1428, 1430, 1430–1431, 1432). In 1432, he served as luogotenente (lieutenant) of Friuli in Udine, where he entertained Ciriaco d'Ancona. His tenure was celebrated in an oration by Giovanni da Spilimbergo. In 1436, he was ambassador to the Duchy of Mantua. In 1443, he was ambassador to the Kingdom of Naples and was named a Procurator of Saint Mark. He died in Venice on 10 November 1446.

== Works ==
First page of the 1475 second edition of Giustiniani's laude (Biblioteca Nazionale Centrale de Firenze, Magl. B.6.29)

Giustiniani wrote and delivered a funeral oration for Admiral Carlo Zeno in 1418. In 1420, while his brother Marco was serving as podestà of Bergamo, he wrote a prologue to its laws, Proemium in leges et statuta Pergami. He translated Plutarch's lives of Cimon, Lucullus and Phocion from Greek into Latin. His surviving correspondence was described by Aldo Oberdorfer as "among the most sincere and spontaneous of the age". His treatise Regulae artificialis memoriae ('Rules on the Art of Memory'), addressed to his son, elaborates a complicated system of mnemonic devices.

Giustiniani wrote secular and religious poetry. In formal Italian with Venetian characteristics, he wrote laude, strambotti and both short and long love songs. He also wrote music and was known in his own day for his singing to the accompaniment of the lute. Musical settings for some of the laude survive, but not for the strambotti.The longer love poems are collected in his Canzoniere, the shorter in Il fiore delle … canzonette del … Lunardo Iustiniano, published at Venice around 1472. At least four of the canzonette are considered spurious, but all thirty have polyphonic musical settings.

Many letters to and from Giustiniani survive. His correspondents include Ciriaco d'Ancona, Guarino Veronese, Francesco Barbaro, Benedetto Bursa, Federico Cornaro, Francesco Filelfo, Andrea Giuliani, Barbone Morosini, Lauro Quirini, Palla Strozzi, Pietro Tommasi and Ambrogio Traversari.

== Bibliography ==
- Carboni, Fabio; Ziino, Agostino (2012). "Polyphonic Laude and Hymns in a Franciscan Codex from the End of the Fifteenth Century". Early Music History. 31: 87–151. doi:10.1017/S0261127912000071.
- Dazzi, Manlio Torquato (1933). "Giustiniani, Leonardo". Enciclopedia Italiana. Treccani.
- Fallows, David (2001). "Giustiniani [Giustinian], Leonardo". Grove Music Online. Oxford University Press.
- Glixon, Jonathan (1990). "The Polyphonic Laude of Innocentius Dammonis". The Journal of Musicology. 8 (1): 19–53. doi:10.2307/763522.
- Griffante, Caterina (2002). "Giustinian, Leonardo". In Peter Hainsworth; David Robey (eds.). The Oxford Companion to Italian Literature. Oxford University Press.
- King, Margaret L. (1985). Venetian Humanism in an Age of Patrician Dominance. Princeton University Press.
- Labalme, Patricia H. (1969). Bernardo Giustiniani: A Venetian of the Quattrocento. Edizioni di Storia e Letteratura.
- Nadin, Lucia (2016). "Giustinian, Leonardo". Dizionario Biografico dei Friulani. Istituto Pio Paschini per la storia della Chiesa in Friuli.
