= Helen C. White =

American English professor (1896–1967)

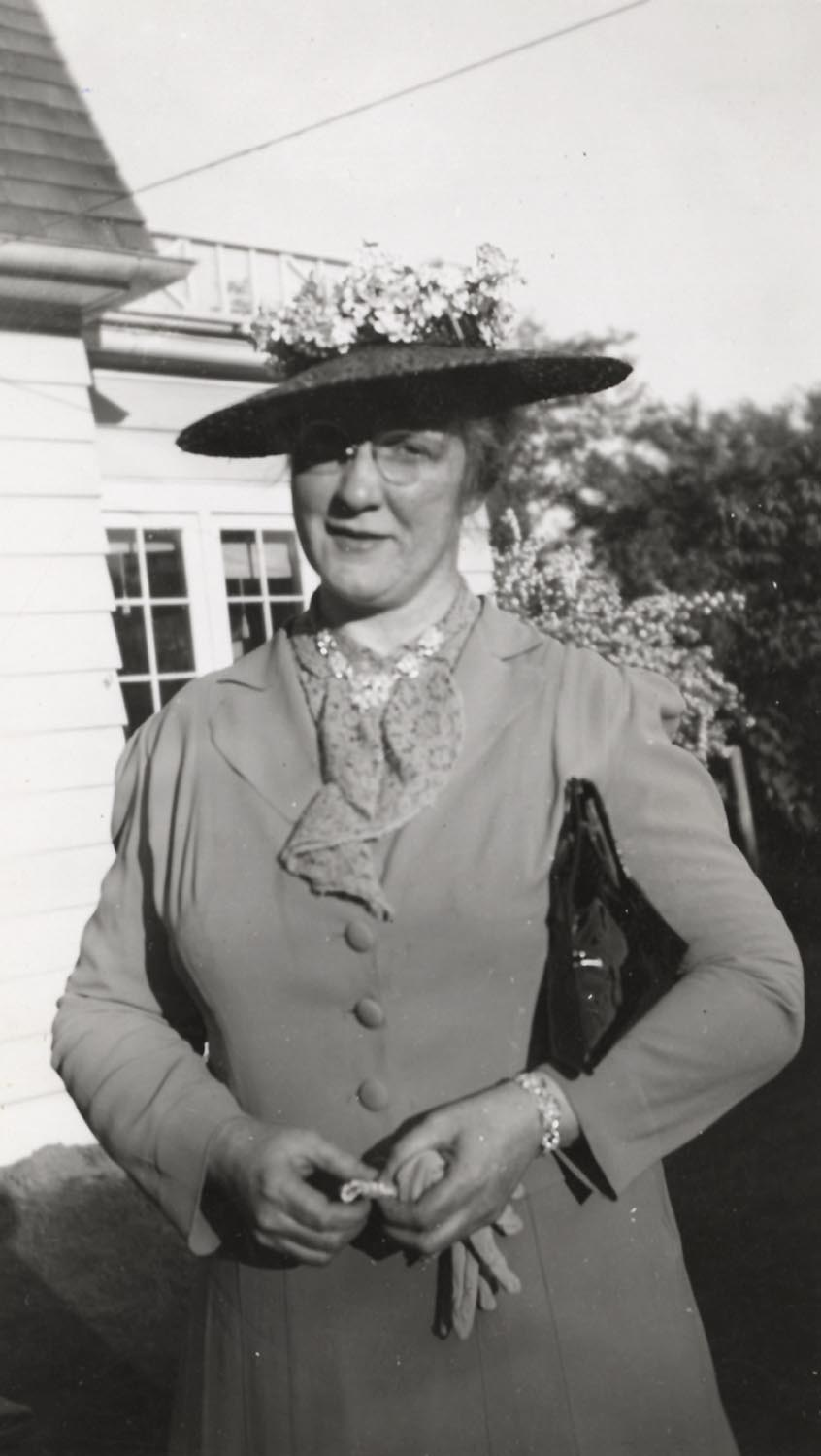
- White in 1941
- Born: November 26, 1896; New Haven, Connecticut, U.S.
- Died: June 7, 1967 (aged 70)
- Relatives: Olive B. White (sister)

Academic background
- Education: Radcliffe College, UW-Madison

Academic work
- Main interests: English literature, writing
- Influenced: August Derleth, Herbert Kubly, Mark Schorer

Helen Constance White (November 26, 1896 – June 7, 1967) was an American academic who was a professor of English at the University of Wisconsin–Madison. White twice served as the English department chair and was the first woman to become a full professor in the university's College of Letters and Science. She was also the first woman elected president of the American Association of University Professors, and a president of the American Association of University Women (AAUW), University of Wisconsin Teachers' Union, and University Club. White wrote six novels and numerous nonfiction books and articles.

White was raised in Boston in a Roman Catholic household, and kept the faith for the rest of her life. She graduated from the Girls' High School and Radcliffe College. After completing her master's degree, she taught at Smith College for two years before moving West to study for her doctorate in Madison. White loved the city and became an assistant professor there upon completing her Ph.D. in 1924 with a dissertation on William Blake. She taught courses including freshman English and metaphysical poetry graduate seminars. White's students included writers such as August Derleth, Herbert Kubly, and Mark Schorer. Graduate students called her "the Purple Goddess" partly due to her predominantly purple wardrobe and exceptional height: she was over six feet tall.

In her 48-year career, White received 23 honorary doctorates, a Laetare Medal, a Siena Medal, an AAUW achievement award, and two Guggenheim Fellowships. She became an Honorary Officer of the Most Excellent Order of the British Empire in 1958 for her scholarship. White was a United States delegate at two UNESCO events and was on the boards of several organizations. Upon her death, the university built Helen C. White Hall in her name. The building houses the university's English department and undergraduate library, which contains 4,000 books from White's collection.

== Early life and career ==
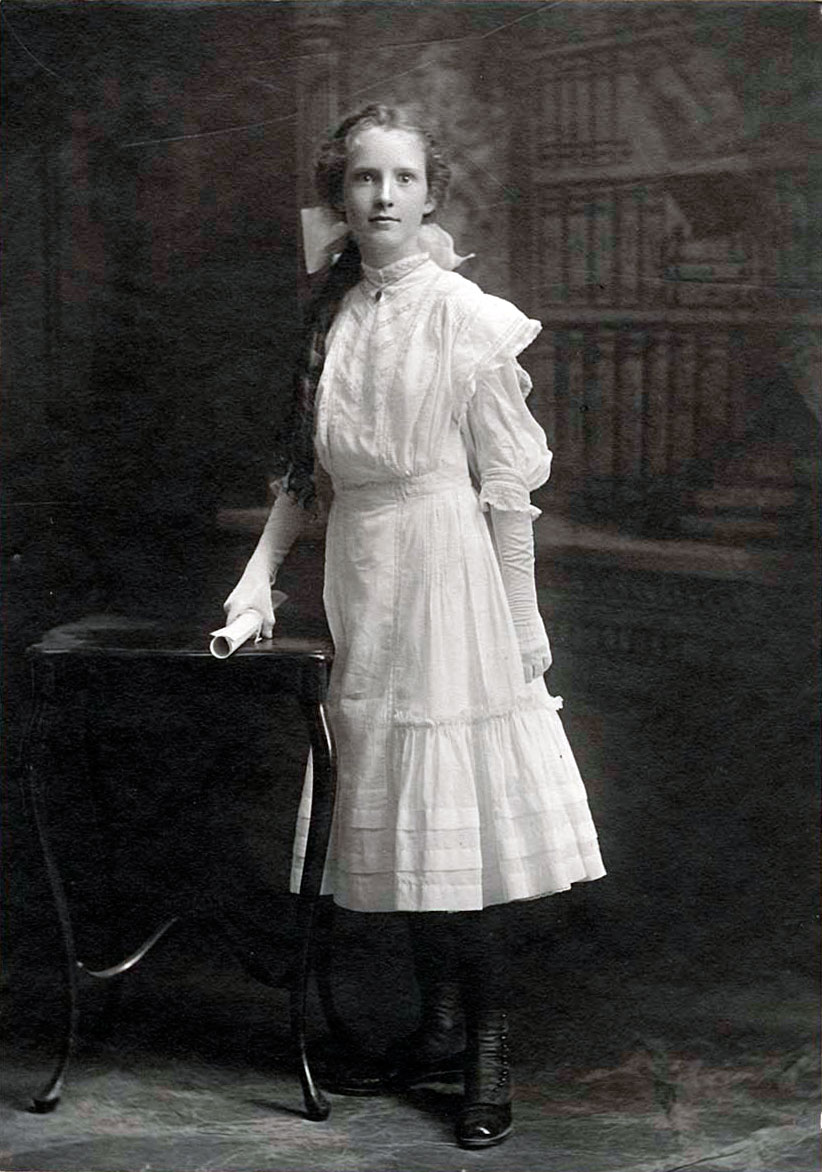
White in high school

Helen Constance White was born November 26, 1896, in New Haven, Connecticut. Her parents, Mary (née King) and John White, had three other children (two daughters, one son) and ran a Roman Catholic household, a faith White maintained passionately for the rest of her life. In 1901, her parents chose to settle in the new Boston suburb of Roslindale for the city's cultural opportunities. White's father left his job as a New York, New Haven and Hartford Railroad clerk to become a civil servant. White described her mother as matriarchal and her father as secretive.

Beginning in 1909, White attended the Boston Girls' High School, where she was studious and performed well.. She participated in the Debating Club and became the editor-in-chief of her school paper, Distaff, in her senior year. She graduated in 1913 and received a Margaret A. Badger Scholarship and an Old South Historical Society prize. During this time, she was a member of the Massachusetts suffrage movement.

White started at Radcliffe College later that year and graduated summa cum laude in three years with a bachelor's degree in English. White was awarded a Phi Beta Kappa key and the George B. Sohier bachelor's thesis prize at her 1916 graduation. She continued at Radcliffe and completed her master's degree in 1917, whereupon she sought teaching posts. In September, White became an Assistant in Smith College's English department, where she taught English for two years. Her friends suggested that she pursue her doctoral study "out West" in Madison, Wisconsin—a proposal White accepted. (Note: Toni McNaron recounted a story about how White's father encouraged her to leave Boston to experience life apart from her mother. White felt this was good advice.)

== Madison ==
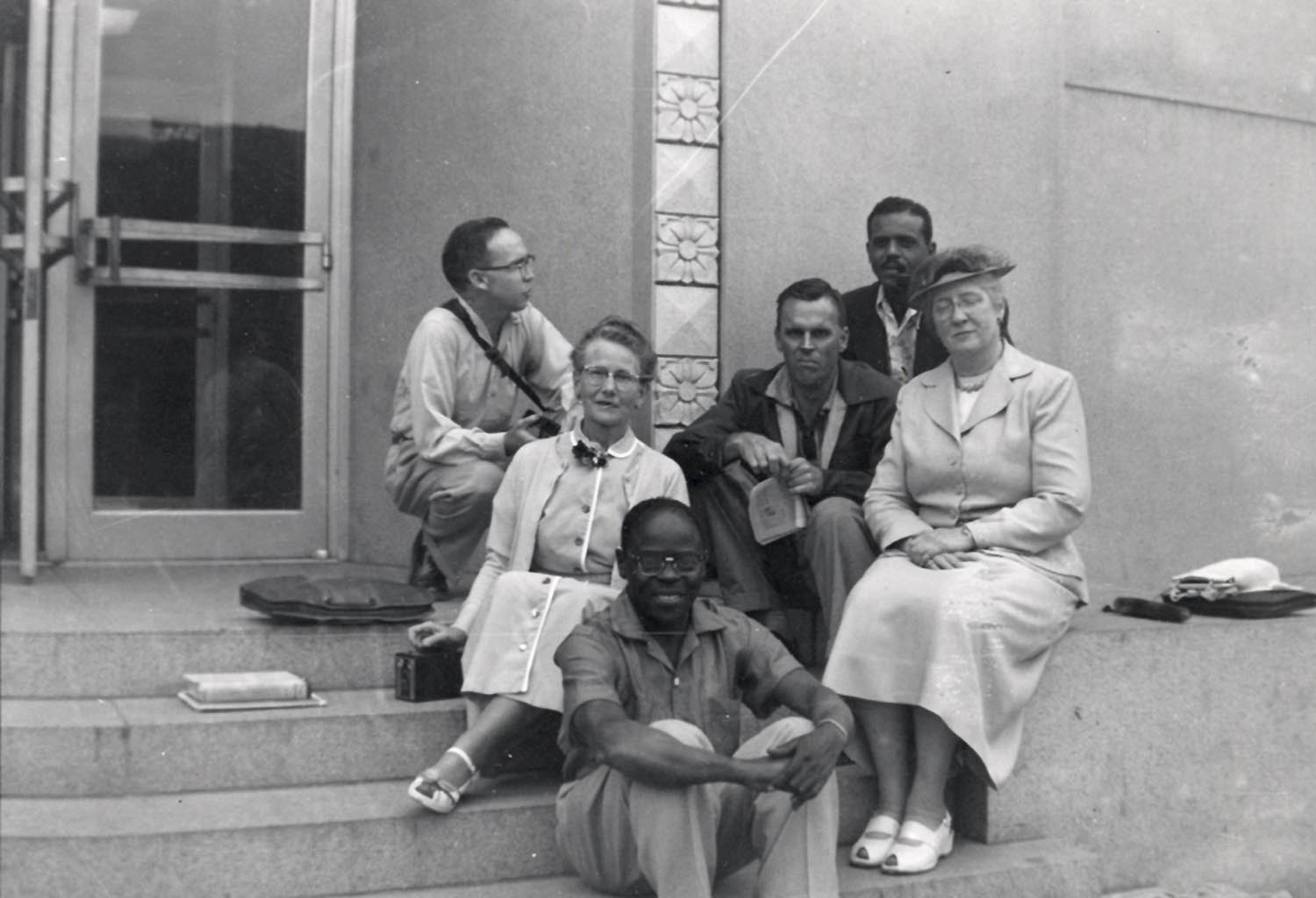
White with 1954 creative writing class outside Memorial Library

White arrived for the 1919 fall semester. She was not familiar with Wisconsin, but quickly came to love Madison and its university, particularly for its people's open spirit and school pride. Her new apartment would become her longtime home. White worked as an instructor in the English department and university library while she worked on her doctorate. As a graduate student, she held office hours on Saturday mornings for anyone interested in her tutoring, often at the expense of her own work. White graduated in 1924 and became an assistant professor the next year. By 1936, she had become a full professor, the first woman to do so in Letters and Science at the university.

She taught several classes, including freshman English, 17th century English literature, metaphysical poetry, and a graduate course in John Donne, George Herbert, Andrew Marvell, Richard Crashaw, and Henry Vaughan. Margaret Thoma of Demcourier described White's English 5 writing seminar as "now famous" in 1942. White taught two classes when the Wisconsin Writers' Institute opened in 1945. White's classes emphasized unambiguous writing and constructive, honest feedback. She was known to amiably reply to all of her mail. White used a four desk system in her apartment, where each desk served a specific function: personal letters, low-priority book notes, high-priority work, or typing. Some of her most notable students, such as August Derleth, Herbert Kubly, and Mark Schorer, continued to rely on White's editorial opinion after their own careers were established. Mark Schorer wrote that White's "patience", "tact", "humor", and "sympathy" were the fundaments of her successful style. White considered teaching "not only stimulating but ... the most worthwhile thing a person can do."

White had little time to write due to her other academic obligations, and once said, "belonging to things is an occupational disease of my profession". White became the English department chair in 1955 and once again in 1961. As chair, White recruited faculty members from established universities, fought for the recognition of her staff, and worked with the faculty members individually, as she would with her students. She wrote in the summers, often while she traveled. Aided by Guggenheim Fellowships, White visited most of Europe. On her first fellowship, she traveled in Italy and studied at Oxford University and the British Museum between 1928 and 1929 for a year. While abroad, White wrote English Devotional Literature, 1600–1640 and was inspired to start her first novel, A Watch in the Night. In mid-1930, she received her second fellowship to verify her work in England. She received a grant from the university to finish her 1935 The Metaphysical Poets in London. White was a visiting scholar at the California Huntington Library between 1939 and 1940, where she worked on Social Criticism in Popular Religious Literature of the Sixteenth Century. She returned to the library in mid-1941. White was a visiting professor at Barnard College between 1943 and 1944, and a visiting professor at Columbia University during the summer of 1948. She also had a strong interest in poetry, though she didn't think highly of her own.

I simplify my wardrobe by wearing purple because it's practical and becoming. When I fly off for a weekend engagement, everything matches automatically.

— Helen C. White

White developed a reputation for frequently wearing purple clothes, a choice made for convenience. White referred to herself as "the large woman in purple", and the English department grad students called her "the Purple Goddess". Toni McNaron wrote that the "Goddess" appellation was partly due to her exceptional height: over six feet.

White retired in 1965 after 48 years of teaching and administration. In her retirement, White was appointed to the university's Institute for Research in the Humanities. She suffered a heart attack in 1966, whereupon her health declined, though she continued to work at the university's Memorial Library. In the next spring, White became sick and died on June 7, 1967. Her burial took place in Jamaica Plain, Massachusetts. Neither she nor her three siblings had married. A memorial service was held in Madison's St. Paul's University Chapel on May 19, 1968.

== Work and recognition ==
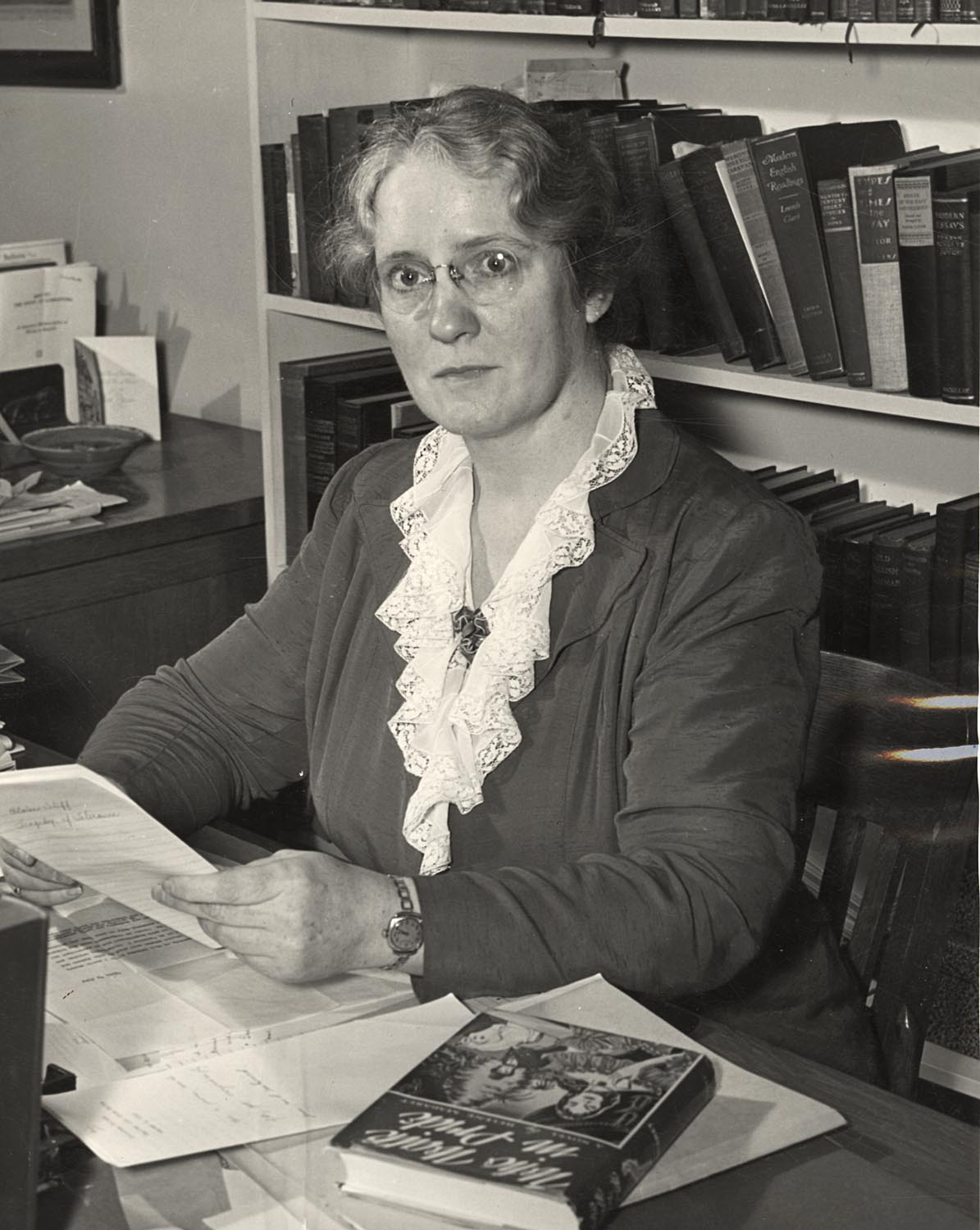
White at her desk

White published her first short story when she was 13. Her first major project was The Mysticism of William Blake, a modified version of her dissertation. It was published in 1927 by the University of Wisconsin Press. She later wrote six novels, including A Watch in the Night (1933), Not Built with Hands, To the End of the World, and Dust on a King's Highway. The Wisconsin State Journal wrote that her novels were highly praised for their historical settings, views towards religion, and contemplative psychology. White also authored Tudor Books of Private Devotion, English Devotional Literature, 1600–1640, Victorian Prose, The Metaphysical Poets (1935), Social Criticism in Popular Religious Literature of the Sixteenth Century, and numerous articles. Her religious works stemmed from her Roman Catholic reverence. White described her publishers as kind for publishing her unpopular scholarly works in-between her profitable novels.

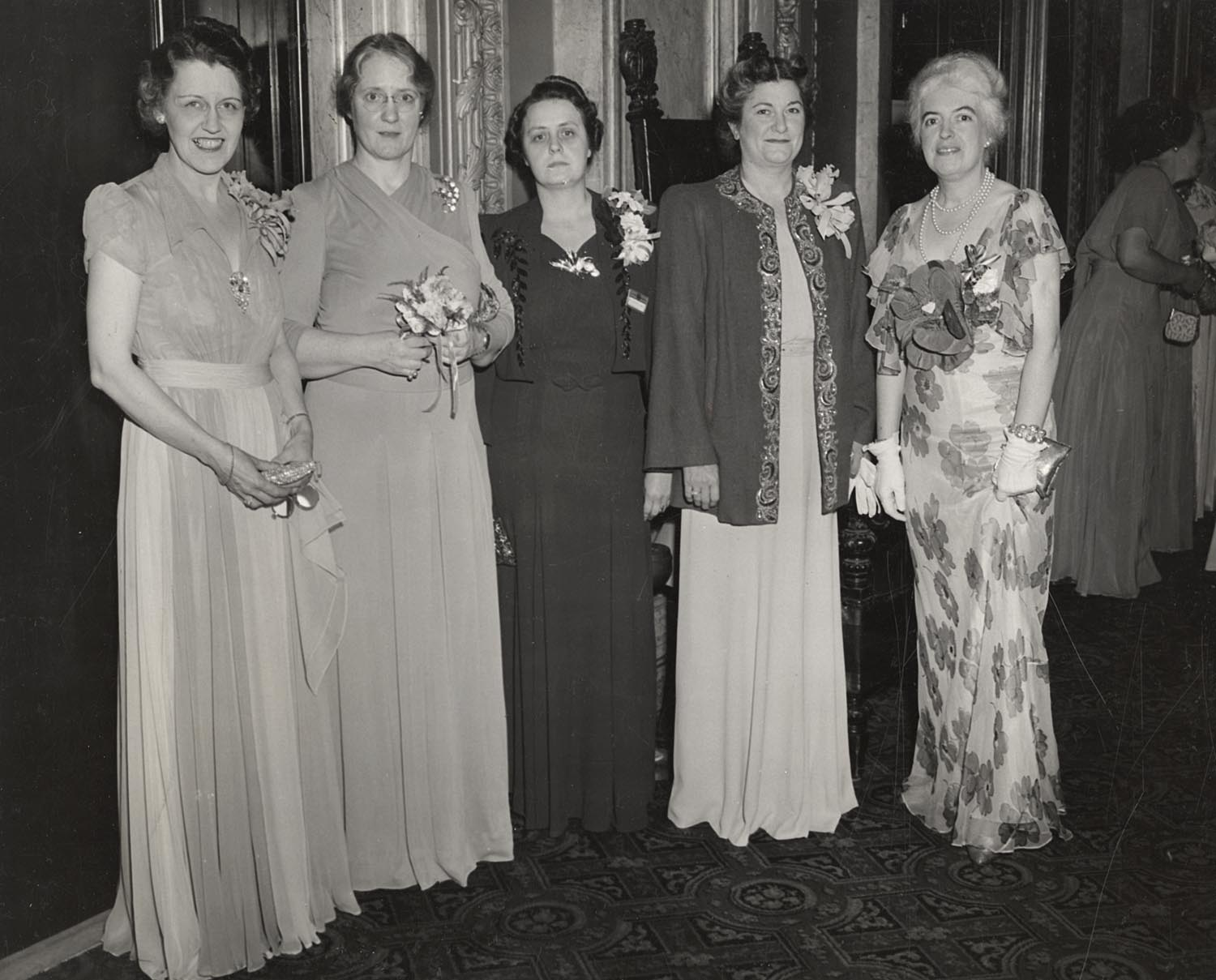
White (second from left) with AAUW officers

White was the first female elected president of the American Association of University Professors and thrice served as president of the American Association of University Women (AAUW), including from 1941 to 1947. White received an AAUW achievement award in 1949 for her scholarly work and international service in the humanities. She also served as the vice president of the International Federation of University Women, president of the University of Wisconsin Teachers' Union, and the first woman president of the University Club. White was awarded two Guggenheim Fellowships, the 1942 Laetare Medal, the 1944 Siena Medal, the 1947 Radcliffe Alumni Association's Distinguished Achievement Award for Education, and 23 honorary degrees (Note: Of her honorary degrees, White said she received the distinctions from Catholic colleges due to her gender and religion, and the distinctions from Protestant colleges as their display of liberality.) from places such as Miami University, Mount Mary College, Mount Saint Scholastica College, Rockford College, Smith College, and Wilson College. She became an Honorary Officer of the Most Excellent Order of the British Empire in 1958 for her renown as a scholar of 16th and 17th century English literature. In 1959 she was elected a Fellow of the American Academy of Arts and Sciences. White was on the United States National commission for UNESCO and represented the United States twice at UNESCO meetings: the 1946 Preparatory Commission for UNESCO and the 1947 second UNESCO General Conference held in Mexico City. White was also on the 1946 U.S. Education Mission to Germany. Additionally, she sat on the boards of the National Conference of Christians and Jews, the American Council on Education, and the Phi Beta Kappa Senate, and was appointed by the U.S. President to the Fulbright Board of Foreign Scholarships.

Upon her death, the University of Wisconsin named a new building after her. It houses the undergraduate library, known as College Library. Helen C. White Hall sits on the edge of campus near Lake Mendota and is seven stories tall. The English department moved from Bascom Hall to the new building when it opened in September 1971. The library holds White's donation of over 4,000 books. The building also houses the philosophy department and Cooperative Children's Book Center. The building housed the library school until 2025, when it moved to the new Morgridge Hall. Hazel McGrath wrote that "no more fitting monument to one of its most eminent scholars could have been built by the University of Wisconsin".
