= Ann Pottinger Saab =

American historian (1934–2019)

- Ann Pottinger, later Saab, from a 1962 newspaper
- Born: Evelyn Ann Pottinger; December 18, 1934; Cambridge, Massachusetts
- Died: January 25, 2019; Greensboro, North Carolina
- Occupation(s): Historian, college professor, writer

Evelyn Ann Pottinger Saab (December 18, 1934 – January 25, 2019) was an American historian, professor, and college administrator based in North Carolina. She published three books of nineteenth-century European history and one novel, and was head of two departments at the University of North Carolina at Greensboro (UNCG).

== Early life and education ==
Pottinger was from Cambridge, Massachusetts, the daughter of David T. Pottinger and Mildred Clark Pottinger. Her father was assistant director of the Harvard University Press, and editor of college textbooks at D.C. Heath and Company. She graduated from Wellesley College in 1955, and completed doctoral studies at Radcliffe College in 1962. At Radcliffe, she won the Caroline Wilby Prize, for her dissertation, Napoleon III and the German Crisis, 1865-1866. Her dissertation was published by Harvard University Press in 1966.

== Career ==
Pottinger joined the faculty of Middlebury College in 1962. She taught history and political science at the University of North Carolina at Greensboro (UNCG) beginning in 1965, became a full professor in 1975, and chaired the history department there from 1978 to 1984. She was also acting head of the classics department, associate dean of the graduate school, and assistant chancellor of the university. She co-directed the sixth annual Human Development Research Institute at UNCG in 1994.

== Publications ==
In addition to her first book, based on her dissertation, Saab was the author of The Origins of the Crimean Alliance (University of Virginia Press 1977), and Reluctant Icon: Gladstone, Bulgaria, and the Working Classes, 1856–1878 (Harvard University Press 1991). She also translated historical writing. for example The peace of Paris, 1856: Studies in war, diplomacy, and peacemaking (1981) by Winfried Baumgart. Articles by Saab appeared in The Muslim World, The Journal of Modern History, The International History Review, and French Historical Studies, including:

- "The Doctors' Dilemma: Britain and the Cretan Crisis 1866-69" (1977)
- "English and Irish reactions to the massacres in Lebanon and Syria, 1860" (1984)
- "A Reassessment of French Foreign Policy during the Crimean War Based on the Papers of Adolphe de Bourqueney" (1986, with John M. Knapp and Françoise de Bourqueney Knapp)
- "Foreign Affairs and New Tories: Disraeli, The Press, and the Crimean War" (2010)
- "Disraeli, Judaism, and the Eastern Question" (2010)

In retirement, she wrote a novel, Bathsheba's Book: A Woman's Tale (2014).

== Personal life ==
Pottinger married Elie (Elias) Georges Saab in 1966, in Lebanon. They had two sons, David and Georges. Her husband died in 2004, and she died in 2019, aged 84 years, in Greensboro, North Carolina.
