= Lorella Jones =

Particle physicist

Lorella M. Jones
- Born: February 22, 1943; Toronto, Ontario
- Died: February 9, 1995 (aged 51); Champaign, Illinois
- Education: Harvard University, California Institute of Technology
- Known for: Research in theoretical particle physics and applications of computers to physics education
- Scientific career
- Fields: Particle physics
- Workplaces: Computer-based Education Research Laboratory

Lorella Margaret Jones (February 22, 1943 – February 9, 1995), was a professor of physics and director of the Computer-based Education Research Laboratory (CERL) at the University of Illinois at Urbana–Champaign. Jones was interested in the application of computers to physics education and championed the cause of women in physics. She wrote an essay entitled "Intellectual Contributions of Women in Physics" in Women of Science: Righting the Record.

== Early life ==
Lorella Margaret Jones was born on February 22, 1943, in Toronto to an astronomer and industrial physicist. She grew up with her parents, Donald A. Jones and Florence Shirley Patterson Jones of Urbana, and a sister Irene Jones of Livermore, California. Aside from her interest in physics, Jones enjoyed hobbies such as gardening at her garden in Meadowbrook Park, south of Urbana, and kayaking. She grew many vegetables at her garden and gave them out amongst her students and colleagues. She would also spend a summer month on an island in Lake Vermillion every year. Jones was very much a nature enthusiast along with being a physicist.

== Education and career ==
Jones was interested in the application of computers to physics education and championed the cause of women in physics.

She wrote an essay entitled "Intellectual Contributions of Women in Physics" in Women of Science: Righting the Record.

She studied at Harvard, concentrating on mathematics, and graduated magna cum laude in 1964. From Harvard she moved on to Caltech receiving an M.Sc. in 1966 and Ph.D. in 1968. She became an associate professor of physics at Illinois in 1974, later becoming a full professor. Her research was in high-energy physics, particularly the force binding nuclear particles to quarks. Her career in research on theoretical high-energy focused on four things: Regge pole theory, phenomenological models of photomeson production, jet calculus in quantum chromodynamics (QCD), and use of Grassmann coordinates to describe internal symmetries. She took a sabbatical in 1981–1982 to work at CERN, becoming a fellow of the American Physical Society in the division of particles and fields in 1982. She became director of the university's Education Research Laboratory in the year 1992, remaining at the University of Illinois for her whole career and publishing a total of 64 papers based on her research.

== Research in Illinois ==
She investigated photoproduction of energized mesons with H.W. Wyld. She examined the truth of the A1 state through watchful fractional wave investigation of the response and affirmed the presence of that pivotal meson by means of the supposed Deck mechanism. This drove her to work out the outcomes of hadronic enchant creation through a "gluon combination" demonstrate and to anticipate the principal highlights of bound quark-antiquark generation, especially the vitality reliance.

She then began research in the domain of partons and QCD. As a team with Migneron and others, she could create equations in the jet calculus of partons, where the viable propagators developed down instead of up, as in the Altarelli–Parisi plot. She in this way reproduced jets through Monte Carlo strategies, indicating how QCD falls from quarks and gluons can, on a basic level, be recognized. She then classified jets through the longitudinal connections between hard particles produced in the hadronic jets.

She ended up being intrigued by the utilization of concealed Grassmann factors for comprehension and ordering molecule symmetries. In work with Delbourgo and White, she explained the anharmonic Grassmann oscillator, which is the fermionic simple of the common anharmonic oscillator. She went ahead to create Dirac-like equations of movement, which incorporated the Grassmann variables in a general sense, and acquired quantized mass spectra, showing the helpfulness of such thoughts.

== Death ==
Lorella Jones died on February 9, 1995, aged 51. She died in a nursing home in Champaign, Illinois. The cause of her death was cancer.
