= Evelyn Hodes Wilson =

American biochemist

- Evelyn Hodes, from a 1942 yearbook
- Born: Evelyn Ash Hodes; October 8, 1921; Philadelphia, Pennsylvania
- Died: March 16, 2001 (aged 79); Philadelphia, Pennsylvania
- Occupations: Biochemist, college professor
- Relatives: Horace Hodes (brother)

Evelyn Ash Hodes Wilson (October 8, 1921 – March 16, 2001) was an American biochemist, college professor, and university administrator.

== Early life and education ==
Evelyn Ash Hodes was born in Philadelphia, the youngest child and only daughter of Morris Hodes and Anna Jacobsen Hodes. Her family was Jewish. One of her five brothers was pediatrician and medical researcher Horace Hodes. Another brother, Robert Hodes, was a neurophysiologist at Mount Sinai Hospital.

She graduated from West Philadelphia High School in 1938. In 1942, she earned a bachelor's degree in chemistry at Bryn Mawr College. Wilson was married when she completed her PhD in biology at Radcliffe College, with a dissertation on antimalarials. Her dissertation won the Caroline Wilby Prize for 1946.

== Career ==
Wilson was a researcher at Merck after completing doctoral studies, and did research there towards the development of prednisone. At Merck she co-authored articles with Max Tishler, Louis Fieser, Huang Minlon, and others. She was a senior chemist at Johnson & Johnson from 1953 to 1959.

Wilson taught science in the local high schools in Highland Park and Westfield, and in 1960 earned a teaching certificate at Rutgers University. She was appointed chair of the science department at New Brunswick High School in the 1965. Beginning in 1972, Wilson was on the faculty of Rutgers; she was an associate professor of education, and taught and studied science pedagogy.

Wilson was active in the League of Women Voters of Highland Park. In 1987, she was named chair of the education task force for New Brunswick Tomorrow. She was associate vice-president for budget and planning at Rutgers when she retired in 1991.

== Publications ==
=== Chemistry ===
- "Nitrogen Mustards" (1951, with Max Tishler)
- "The Conversion of Cholic Acid into 3α-Hydroxy-12-keto-Δ^{9(11)}-cholenic Acid" (1951, with Louis F. Fieser, Srinivasa Rajagopalan, and Max Tishler)
- "Steroid 17(α)-Acetates" (1952, with Huang Minlon, N. L. Wendler, and Max Tishler)
- "Synthesis of Δ^{1}-Allopregnene-17α,21-diol-3,11,20-trione-21-acetate" (1952, with Max Tishler)
- "Pantothenic Acid Salts" (1954, with John Weijlard and Max Tishler)

=== Science education ===
- "Why Not Science?" (1969)
- "Course Development: A Legitimate Scholarly Pursuit" (1972)

== Personal life and legacy ==
Evelyn Hodes married Harvard chemist Armin G. Wilson in 1943. They had a son, Jonathan. She died in 2001, aged 79 years, at a hospital in Philadelphia. Soka University of America offers an Evelyn Hodes Wilson scholarship, named in her memory.
