= Dewilda Naramore Harris =

American foreign service officer

- Dewilda Naramore, from a 1937 newspaper
- Born: Dewilda Ellen Naramore; May 20, 1918; Washington, D.C.
- Died: July 7, 1995 (aged 77); Alpena, Michigan
- Occupations: Historian, economist, foreign service officer, businesswoman, philanthropist
- Spouse: William Page Harris

Dewilda Naramore Harris (May 20, 1918 – July 7, 1995) was an American historian, economist, foreign service officer, and philanthropist.

== Early life and education ==
Dewilda Ellen Naramore was born in Washington, D.C., the daughter of Chester A. Naramore and Grace E. Chilson Naramore. Her father was a petroleum geologist. She spent one year at the American School of Berlin, and graduated from Bronxville High School. She graduated from Bryn Mawr College in 1938, and won the school's prestigious European Fellowship, and several other scholarships and awards. She earned a PhD in history at Radcliffe College and Harvard University in 1942. Her doctoral dissertation, "The Arrière-ban in Medieval France", won the Caroline Wilby Prize in 1942.

== Career ==
During World War II, Naramore worked as an economist at the Office of Price Administration. After the war, Naramore, who spoke German well, returned to Germany as a foreign service officer. She worked in various roles in Stuttgart and Bonn with the OMGUS and the Allied High Commission. She was a deputy commercial attaché in 1953 and 1954. She wrote about her postwar foreign service work in an essay, "My Job in Germany, 1945–1954" (1993).

Harris was on assignment to the Department of Commerce in 1955 and 1956. After marriage in 1956, she was a businesswoman, helping her husband to run concrete and lumber businesses in the Detroit area, until they retired in 1982. The Harrises endowed professorships at Stanford University, Dartmouth College, and Bryn Mawr College.

== Personal life ==
Naramore married businessman William Page Harris in 1956, as his second wife. She died in 1995, aged 77 years, at a hospital in Alpena, Michigan.
