= Florence Shirley Patterson Jones =

Canadian-born American astronomer

- Born: Florence Shirley Patterson; March 26, 1913; Newmarket, Ontario
- Died: December 18, 2000 (aged 87); Urbana, Illinois
- Occupation: astronomer

Florence Shirley Patterson Jones (March 26, 1913 – December 18, 2000) was a Canadian-born American astronomer.

== Early life ==
Florence Shirley Patterson was born in Newmarket, Ontario, the daughter of William and Florence Patterson. She earned undergraduate degrees in mathematics and physics at the University of Toronto in 1935. The following year she worked on a project at David Dunlap Observatory, and earned a master's degree at Toronto with her astronomy thesis, titled ""Stellar wavelengths from spectrographs of small dispersions." In 1938 she moved to Massachusetts and worked at the Harvard College Observatory, under advisors Harlow Shapley and Cecilia Payne-Gaposchkin. She received funding from the Royal Society of Canada in 1939, and from a Pickering Fellowship in 1940. Patterson completed her doctoral work in astronomy at Radcliffe College in 1941, with a dissertation titled "Surface photometry of external galaxies." Her dissertation won the Caroline Wilby Prize for "best original work in any department" at Radcliffe in 1941.

== Career ==
Patterson received the Gold Medal of the Royal Astronomical Society of Canada in 1935. During World War II, she worked at an optical glass manufacturer in Toronto, assuring quality in the production of gun sights, periscopes, and range finders. She told colleagues, "When the world settles down again, I will return to Astronomy; however, in the meantime I will not only be doing my share to make this world safe for culture by applying the technique I have learned in astronomy, but will also be acquiring a knowledge of instruments which will make me a better astronomer.

After the war, she moved to the United States for her husband's work, and became an astronomy lecturer, teaching at University at Buffalo, Wellesley College, Carnegie Institute of Technology, and Trinity College in Connecticut, depending on where they lived. She was a member of the American Astronomical Society, the Royal Astronomical Society of Canada, and the American Association for the Advancement of Science.

Patterson Jones was also a master weaver; she wore suits made from fabrics she had woven, exhibited her works, and taught weaving. She was a member of the Boston Weavers Guild, the Champaign Spinners and Weavers, the Cross Country Weavers, the Handweavers Guild of America, and the Complex Weavers.

== Personal life ==
Patterson married Canadian physicist Donald A. Jones during World War II. They had two children, Lorella and Irene. The family became United States citizens in 1948. Patterson Jones died in 2000, from cancer, aged 87 years, in Urbana, Illinois. Her elder daughter Lorella M. Jones (1943-1995) was the first woman to become a tenured physics professor at the University of Illinois. Her younger daughter Irene Jones is a biomedical researcher at Lawrence Livermore National Laboratory in California.
