= Olive B. White =

American college dean

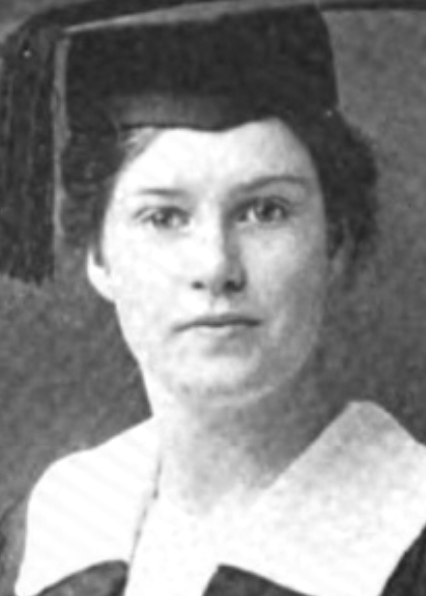
- White in 1919
- Born: Olive Bernardine White; May 28, 1899; New Haven, Connecticut, US
- Died: September 9, 1983 (aged 84); Boston, Massachusetts, US
- Occupations: Writer, college professor, college dean
- Relatives: Helen C. White (sister)

Olive Bernardine White (May 28, 1899 – September 9, 1983) was an American writer, college professor and longtime Dean of Women at Bradley University in Illinois.

== Early life and education ==
White was born in New Haven, Connecticut and raised in the Roslindale neighborhood of Boston, the daughter of John White and Mary King White. Her family was Roman Catholic. Her older sister Helen C. White was also an English professor, at the University of Wisconsin.

She graduated Girls' High School in Boston in 1915. She earned a bachelor's degree at Radcliffe College in 1918, and stayed at Radcliffe to complete a master's degree in 1919, and a PhD in 1926. White won Radcliffe's Caroline Wilby Prize twice, and was the only person to do so, when she won in 1918 for her undergraduate thesis, "The Verse Translations of John Dryden", and shared the prize with Eleanor Lansing Dulles in 1926, for her dissertation "The Background of English Renaissance in 15th Century Oxford".

== Career ==
White was an English professor, head of the English department, and Dean of Women at Bradley University from 1933 into the 1960s. She wrote a school history, Centennial History of the Girls' High School of Boston (1952), and two "Catholic historical" novels,The King's Good Servant (1936), about Thomas More, and Late Harvest (1940). "Although the book proceeds slowly and takes considerable more time in telling its story than is necessary," noted one reviewer of the latter novel, "it is not without its good points." She was active in the Peoria Community Council, the American Association of University Women and the American Red Cross.

== Publications ==
- The King's Good Servant (novel, 1936)
- Late Harvest (novel, 1940)
- “Richard Taverner's Interpretation of Erasmus in Proverbes or Adagies" (article, 1944)
- Centennial History of The Girls' High School of Boston (history, 1952)

== Personal life and legacy ==
White died at a hospital in Boston in 1983, aged 84 years. Bradley University gives an annual Olive B. White Award to an outstanding creative writing major. There is a tradition on the Bradley campus that White's ghost haunts Constance Hall, once a women's dormitory, now the music building.
