= Gerda Richards Crosby =

American writer

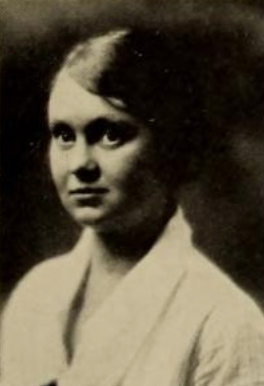
- Gerda Richards, from the 1922 yearbook of Smith College
- Born: June 19, 1900; Fall River, Massachusetts, United States
- Died: April 6, 1953 (aged 52); Cambridge, Massachusetts, United States
- Occupation(s): Writer, historian, college professor
- Notable work: Disarmament and peace in British politics, 1914-1919 (1957)
- Relatives: William Otis Crosby (father-in-law)

Gerda Cornell Richards Crosby (June 19, 1900 – April 6, 1953) was an American historian, college professor, and writer. She was awarded the Caroline Wilby Prize at Radcliffe College in 1933, and she is the namesake of the Gerda Richards Crosby Prize, awarded annually by the Harvard University Department of Government.

== Early life and education ==
Gerda Cornell Richards was born and raised in Fall River, Massachusetts, the daughter of John Bion Richards and Winifred May Cornell Richards. She was a Mayflower descendant; Richard Warren was her Mayflower ancestor. In 1921 she was a page at the annual convention of the Daughters of the American Revolution in Washington, D.C.

Richards graduated from Smith College in 1922, and earned her master's and doctoral degrees at Radcliffe College in 1923 and 1933, respectively. Her dissertation, "The Transformation of the Tory Party after 1780: A Study in Eighteenth-Century Party Politics", won the Caroline Wilby Prize for 1933.

== Career ==
In 1934 Crosby was teaching at Dartmouth College, when she took leave to work in Washington with the Committee on Economic Security. In the 1940s, Crosby taught at Wellesley College, Hunter College, and Radcliffe College. She reviewed academic monographs for The Yale Review, and The American Historical Review. Although her output was cut short by her early death, two works by Crosby have remained relevant to historians:

- "George III: Historians and a Royal Reputation" (1941), in Essays in Modern English History, in Honor of Wilbur Cortez Abbott
- Disarmament and peace in British politics, 1914-1919 (1957, published posthumously)

== Personal life and legacy ==
Gerda Richards married engineering geologist Irving Ballard Crosby in 1929. She died in 1953, aged 52 years, in Cambridge, Massachusetts, survived by her husband and both her parents. Harvard University's Department of Government awards an annual Gerda Richards Crosby Prize. Recipients of the Gerda Richards Crosby Prize include lawyer Oona A. Hathaway and economist Amy Finkelstein.
