= Mabel Ellery Adams =

Author on education for children with special needs

Mabel Ellery Adams (2 February 1865 – 23 September 1935) was an American writer on education for children with special needs, a teacher and principal at Horace Mann School in Boston. She was a president of the Sarah Fuller House for Little Deaf Children, a member of the National Research Council at Washington on the Problems of Deaf and a member of the Committee on the Hard-of-Hearing Child. She wrote numerous articles for American Annals of the Deaf.

== Education and academic career ==
Mabel Ellery Adams was born on 2 February 1865. In 1907, she received the Caroline Wilby Prize for an inquiry into the condition of 100 deaf persons who had been pupils at the Horace Mann School in Boston. In 1908, she graduated from Radcliffe College.

From 1919 to 1935, Adams was a principal of the Horace Mann School for the Deaf in Boston. In 1928, she received an honorary master's degree from Gallaudet College. From 1927 to 1928, Adams was a member of the National Research Council at Washington on the Problems of Deaf and in 1930 was a member of the Committee on the Hard-of-Hearing Child at a White House Conference.

In 1933, Adams attended the 28th meeting of the convention of American Instructors of the Deaf in a joint meeting with an international congress on education of the deaf in West Trenton, New Jersey.

She is mentioned as a notable American woman in the book Notable American Women, 1607-1950: A Biographical Dictionary.

Mabel Ellery Adams died on 23 September 1935. She is buried at Milton Cemetery in Milton, Massachusetts.

== Publications (selection) ==
- Adams, M. E. (1896). The Language Sense. American Annals of the Deaf, 278–292.
- Putnam, G. H., & Adams, M. E. (1896). Two schools across the water. American Annals of the Deaf, 380–390.
- Adams, M. E. (1903). Trying To Use The Akoulalion.—II. American Annals of the Deaf, 23–33.
- Adams, M. E. (1904). Three Years Of Language. American Annals of the Deaf, 209–229.
- Adams, M. E. (1909). A Way Of Imparting Notions Of Tense To Young Deaf Children. American Annals of the Deaf, 160–166.
- Johnson, R. O., & Adams, M. E. (1910). The Cost And Efficiency Of The Education Of The Deaf In Day-Schools And Institutions. American Annals of the Deaf, 385–394.
- Adams, M. E. (1910). The Cost and Efficiency of the Education of the Deaf in Day Schools and Institutions. Journal of Education, 72(1), 15-15.
- Adams, M. E. (1914). The Intelligibility Of The Speech Of The Deaf. American Annals of the Deaf, 451–460.
- Adams, M. E. (1915). A Lesson In Preparatory History In A Fifth Grade In A School For The Deaf. American Annals of the Deaf, 273–277.
- Adams, M. E. (1920). History teaching. American Annals of the Deaf, 414–424.
- Adams, M. E. (1927). How an Old Day-School Serves its Public. American Annals of the Deaf, 140–153.
- Adams, M. E. (1928). A Preschool Experiment. American Annals of the Deaf, 169–171.
- Adams, M. E. (1929). A Few Memories Of Alexander Graham Bell. American Annals of the Deaf, 467–479.
- Adams, M. E. (1931). What Parents Want For Their Deaf Children. American Annals of the Deaf, 264–268.
- Adams, M. E. (1931). Vocational Training In Day-Schools. American Annals of the Deaf, 243–248.
