= Frank Oz =

American actor and puppeteer (born 1944)

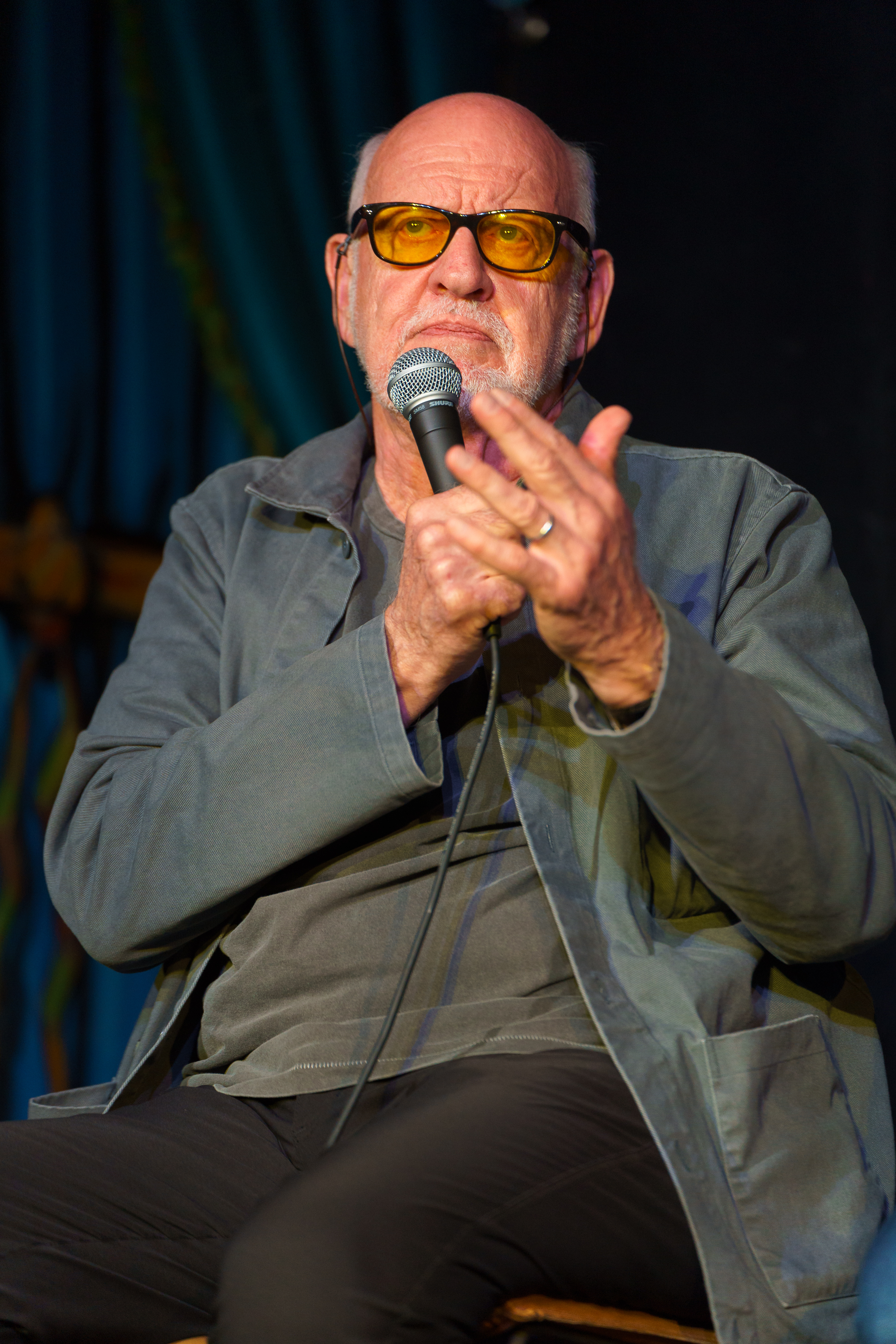
- Oz in 2024
- Born: Frank Richard Oznowicz; May 25, 1944 (age 82); Hereford, Herefordshire, England
- Citizenship: United States
- Occupations: Puppeteer; filmmaker; actor
- Years active: 1961–present
- Spouses: Robin Garsen (m. 1979; div. 2005) Victoria Labalme (m. 2011)
- Children: 4

Frank Richard Oznowicz (born May 25, 1944), known professionally as Frank Oz, is an American puppeteer, filmmaker, and actor. He is best known for his involvement with Jim Henson and George Lucas through The Muppets, Sesame Street, and Star Wars, as well as his directorial work in feature films and theater.

The son of puppeteers, Oz worked as an apprentice puppeteer during his teenage years in Oakland, California. Despite his interest in journalism, he continued his career as a puppeteer when he was hired by the Jim Henson Company in 1963, going on to perform several television characters such as Miss Piggy, Fozzie Bear, Animal, and Sam Eagle on The Muppet Show (1976–1981) and Cookie Monster, Bert, and Grover on Sesame Street from 1969 to 2013. He was hired by Lucas to perform as Yoda in the Star Wars film series, beginning with The Empire Strikes Back (1980) and reprising the role in seven subsequent films and various media for more than four decades.

Oz is also known for his high-profile work as a filmmaker, having directed the films The Dark Crystal (1982), The Muppets Take Manhattan (1984), Little Shop of Horrors (1986), Dirty Rotten Scoundrels (1988), What About Bob? (1991), The Indian in the Cupboard (1995), In & Out (1997), Bowfinger (1999), The Score (2001), The Stepford Wives (2004), and Death at a Funeral (2007), as well as an episode of Leverage (2011).

== Early life ==
Oz was born Frank Richard Oznowicz in Hereford, Herefordshire on May 25, 1944, the son of Belgian mother Frances (née Ghevaert; 1910–1989) and Dutch-Polish father Isadore "Mike" Oznowicz (1916–1998), both of whom were puppeteers who had moved to England when his father joined the Royal Netherlands Motorized Infantry Brigade. His mother was an ethnically Flemish Catholic and his father was Jewish. Some of his parents' puppets, including one that was made to mock Adolf Hitler, survived World War II and were presented at the Contemporary Jewish Museum and the Dutch National Archives. His father later worked as a window trimmer.

The family left England when Oz was six months old, living in his mother's native Belgium until he was five. They then moved to the U.S. and settled in Montana in 1951, before eventually relocating to Oakland, California. Oz attended Oakland Technical High School and Oakland City College. He worked as an apprentice puppeteer at Children's Fairyland as a teenager with the Vagabond Puppets, a production of the Oakland Recreation Department, where Lettie Connell was his mentor.

== Career ==
=== Performing ===
Oz performed as a puppeteer with Jim Henson’s Muppets. As a teenager, he worked with the Vagabond Puppets at the Children's Fairyland of Oakland, which is how he first met Henson. He was 19 when he joined Henson in New York to work on the Muppets in 1963. His characters have included Miss Piggy, Fozzie Bear, Animal, and Sam Eagle on The Muppet Show, and Cookie Monster, Bert and Grover on Sesame Street.

In addition to performing a variety of characters, Oz was one of the primary collaborators responsible for the development of the Muppets, known most notably for his chemistry with Jim Henson himself, performing in such pairings as: Ernie and Bert; Cookie Monster and Kermit the Frog; Kermit and Miss Piggy; Kermit and Fozzie Bear; Kermit and Grover; Ernie and Cookie Monster; Rowlf the Dog and Fozzie Bear; Rowlf and Miss Piggy, and The Swedish Chef (Henson performed the head and voice, with Oz normally operating the hands). Oz performed as a puppeteer in over 75 productions, including Labyrinth (as the Wiseman), video releases, and television specials, as well as countless other public appearances, episodes of Sesame Street, and other Jim Henson series. His puppetry work spans from 1963 to the present, although he semi-retired from performing his Muppets characters in 2001 (continuing to perform on Sesame Street on a yearly basis through 2012). In 2001 following his retirement, his characters were taken over by Eric Jacobson, with the exception of Cookie Monster, who was taken over by David Rudman.

Oz explained why he decided on leaving the Muppets in a 2007 interview:

One was that I was a dad, I have four kids. The reason was that I was constantly asked to do stuff. And also, I'd done this for 30 years, and I'd never wanted to be a puppeteer in the first place. I wanted to be a journalist, and really what I wanted to do was direct theatre and direct movies. So it was more a slow progression, working with Jim, but I felt limited. As an actor and a performer, you always feel limited because you're not the source of the creation, and I wanted to be the source. I wanted to be the guy and give my view of the world. And if I screw it up, I screw it up, but at least I tried. And as a director, what you're really showing is you're showing the audience your view of the world ... I've always enjoyed, more than anything else in the world, bringing things to life, whether it's characters or actors in a scene or moments in movies. I've done so much with the puppets, that I'd always wanted to work with actors.

Oz is the performer of Jedi Master Yoda from George Lucas's Star Wars series. Henson had originally been contacted by Lucas about performing Yoda. Henson was preoccupied, so he suggested Oz be assigned as the chief puppeteer of the character, as well as a creative consultant. Oz performed the puppet and provided the voice for Yoda in The Empire Strikes Back (1980), Return of the Jedi (1983), Star Wars: Episode I – The Phantom Menace (1999), and Star Wars: The Last Jedi (2017). Director Rian Johnson decided to return to using a puppet instead of using computer-generated imagery (CGI) in Star Wars: The Last Jedi (2017), even using the original mold, because he felt CGI would not have worked as it was not true to the Yoda Luke knew in The Empire Strikes Back (1980). Oz also provided the voice of a CGI Yoda in Star Wars: Episode II – Attack of the Clones (2002) and Star Wars: Episode III – Revenge of the Sith (2005). The conversion to CGI was met with some criticism among fans, but Oz himself said that was "exactly what [Lucas] should have done." Oz voiced Yoda in Disney theme park attractions, including Star Tours–The Adventures Continue and within Star Wars: Galaxy's Edge as well as in the Star Wars Rebels episodes "Path of the Jedi" and "Shroud of Darkness".

Oz voiced Yoda in the 2020 Oculus Quest virtual reality game Tales from the Galaxy's Edge alongside original C-3PO performer Anthony Daniels.

He directed the 2017 documentary Muppet Guys Talking: Secrets Behind the Show the Whole World Watched in which he and other Muppet performers discuss working behind the scenes with Jim Henson and the Muppets.

=== Directing ===
Inspiration as a filmmaker came to Oz upon a viewing of the Orson Welles film Touch of Evil (1958), the director told Robert K. Elder in an interview for The Film That Changed My Life:

"I think it opened up my view of film – that there's so much more that could be done. Actually, by breaking so many rules, he allowed other people to say, 'Hey, I can maybe think of some stuff, too!' He just opened up the possibilities more for me. That's what he did."

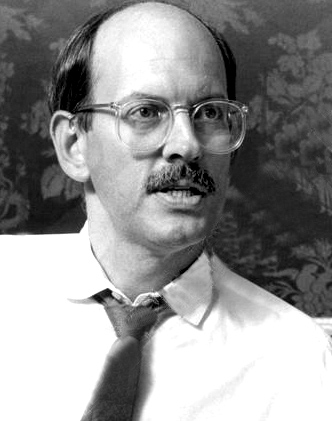
Oz in 1984

Oz began his behind-the-camera work when he co-directed the fantasy film The Dark Crystal with long-time collaborator Jim Henson (Oz also puppeteered Aughra and the Skeksis Chamberlain in the film). The film featured the most advanced puppets ever created for a movie. Oz further employed those skills in directing 1984's The Muppets Take Manhattan, as well as sharing a screenwriting credit.

In 1986, he directed his first film that did not involve Henson, Little Shop of Horrors. The musical film starred Rick Moranis and Ellen Greene, as well as Vincent Gardenia, Steve Martin, Bill Murray, John Candy, Christopher Guest, Jim Belushi and a 15-foot-tall talking plant (voiced by Levi Stubbs) which, at its ultimate size, required up to 60 puppeteers to operate. The film allowed Oz to show his ability to work with live actors and led to opportunities to direct films that did not include puppetry.

Usually helming comedic productions, Oz went on to direct Dirty Rotten Scoundrels in 1988, starring Steve Martin and Michael Caine; What About Bob? in 1991, starring Bill Murray and Richard Dreyfuss; and Housesitter in 1992, starring Steve Martin and Goldie Hawn (all of which were scored by Miles Goodman). Later films include The Indian in the Cupboard (1995), In & Out (1997), Bowfinger (1999), The Score (2001), the 2004 remake of The Stepford Wives, and the original Death at a Funeral (2007).

Oz has frequently experienced on-set tension while directing his films, notably during the productions of What About Bob?, In & Out, The Score and The Stepford Wives.

In 2016, Oz directed a one-man stage show titled In & Of Itself starring Derek DelGaudio, which had its world premiere at the Geffen Playhouse on May 16. In April 2017, with the financial backing by Neil Patrick Harris among others, the play began its Off-Broadway theatrical run, which was initially slated for 10 weeks, but ended up extending its run for 72 weeks. In October 2020, the streaming service Hulu purchased the rights to a live recording of the play, which debuted on January 22, 2021.

=== Unrealized projects ===
In the late 1980s, Oz was attached to direct a film adaptation of F. Scott Fitzgerald's 1922 short story "The Curious Case of Benjamin Button" for Universal Pictures, with Martin Short slated to star. Oz dropped out of the project after he could not figure out how to make the story work.

Oz was approached by Paramount to direct the 1990 film Ghost after Paramount picked up the project. Screenwriter Bruce Joel Rubin approved of his hiring as he liked his both Little Shop of Horrors and Dirty Rotten Scoundrels, though Oz would eventually leave the film as he wanted to digitally erase Sam's shadow when he became a ghost, which would've massively inflated the budget.

Oz was also going to direct the 1990 film Mermaids after Lasse Hallström dropped out of the project. However, Oz also left the project due to creative differences and was ultimately replaced by Richard Benjamin. Oz reportedly did not get along with Cher, who starred in the film.

It was reported in 1992 that Oz was slated to direct a film adaptation of the musical Dreamgirls for The Geffen Film Company. Oz also planned to direct an unmade film titled Swing Vote before directing Dreamgirls.

In the late 1990s, it was reported that Oz was going to direct either Sylvester Stallone or Bruce Willis in an unmade film titled Ump for Metro-Goldwyn-Mayer.

Oz claimed in a 2007 interview with The A.V. Club that he turned down the offer to direct Harry Potter and the Chamber of Secrets (2002). However, Oz later retracted his statement about turning down the project in a 2021 interview. "No, they didn't offer it to me. They asked me if I was interested. So it wasn't really an offer."

In 2006, Dick Cook hired Oz to write and direct The Cheapest Muppet Movie Ever Made for Walt Disney Pictures. However, Disney passed on the project in favor of Jason Segel's script for what would become The Muppets following Cook's departure from the studio.

In 2013, it was reported that Oz was to direct Billy Crystal in an unmade film titled Winter’s Discontent.

=== Acting ===
As an actor, Oz appeared in one scene as a Corrections Officer in The Blues Brothers (1980), directed by John Landis. He appeared in a similar role and scene in Trading Places (1983), also directed by Landis. He had roles in several other Landis films including An American Werewolf in London (1981), Spies Like Us (1985), Innocent Blood (1992), and Blues Brothers 2000 (1998). In 2001, he had a voice acting role in the Pixar film Monsters, Inc. as Randall's scare assistant, Fungus. In 2005, he had a minor part in the Columbia film Zathura as the voice of the robot. He played a lawyer in the 2019 film Knives Out.

Oz played a surgeon in scenes cut from the theatrical release of Superman III. Other cameos include The Muppet Movie, The Great Muppet Caper, The Muppets Take Manhattan and several other Jim Henson-related films that did not involve just his puppeteering.

When Oz does not appear in a Landis film, his name is often spoken in the background. During airport scenes in Into the Night and Coming to America, there are announcements on the PA system for "Mr. Frank Oznowicz".

== Personal life ==
Oz married Robin Garsen in 1979 and they divorced in 2005; he has four children from their marriage. He married Victoria Labalme, performing artist and daughter of historian Patricia Hochschild Labalme and designer George Labalme Jr., in 2011. He maintained a residence in England for nine years, and lives in Manhattan as of 2012.

== Filmography ==
=== Film ===
| Year | Title | Role | Notes |
|---|---|---|---|
| 1979 | The Muppet Movie | Fozzie Bear; Miss Piggy; Sam Eagle; Animal; Marvin Suggs; Additional characters | Puppeteer/Voice, Also creative consultant |
| 1980 | The Blues Brothers | Corrections officer | Also voice of Elwood's building manager |
| 1980 | The Empire Strikes Back | Yoda | Puppeteer/Voice |
| 1981 | The Great Muppet Caper | Fozzie Bear; Miss Piggy; Sam Eagle; Animal; Additional characters | Puppeteer/Voice |
| 1981 | An American Werewolf in London | Mr. Collins | |
| 1982 | The Dark Crystal | Aughra; Chamberlain | Puppeteer |
| 1983 | Superman III | Surgeon | Deleted scene |
| 1983 | Return of the Jedi | Yoda | Puppeteer/Voice |
| 1983 | Trading Places | Booking cop | |
| 1984 | The Muppets Take Manhattan | Fozzie Bear; Miss Piggy; Sam Eagle; Animal; Bert; Cookie Monster; Ocean Breeze Board member Additional characters | Puppeteer/Voice |
| 1985 | Spies Like Us | Test proctor | |
| 1985 | Sesame Street Presents: Follow That Bird | Cookie Monster; Bert; Grover | Puppeteer/Voice |
| 1986 | Labyrinth | The Wiseman | Puppeteer |
| 1991 | Muppet*Vision 3D | Miss Piggy; Fozzie Bear; Sam Eagle; Additional characters | Puppeteer/Voice, Theme park attraction |
| 1992 | Innocent Blood | Pathologist | |
| 1992 | The Muppet Christmas Carol | Fozzie Bear; Miss Piggy; Sam Eagle; Animal; Additional characters | Puppeteer/Voice |
| 1996 | Muppet Treasure Island | Fozzie Bear; Miss Piggy; Sam Eagle; Animal; Additional characters | Voice |
| 1998 | Blues Brothers 2000 | Warden | |
| 1999 | Star Wars: Episode I – The Phantom Menace | Yoda | Puppeteer/Voice |
| 1999 | Muppets from Space | Fozzie Bear; Miss Piggy; Sam Eagle; Animal; Additional characters | Voice |
| 1999 | The Adventures of Elmo in Grouchland | Bert; Grover; Cookie Monster | Puppeteer/Voice |
| 2001 | Monsters, Inc. | Jeff Fungus | Voice |
| 2002 | Star Wars: Episode II – Attack of the Clones | Yoda | Voice |
| 2005 | Zathura | Robot | Voice |
| 2005 | Star Wars: Episode III – Revenge of the Sith | Yoda | Voice |
| 2011 | Star Tours–The Adventures Continue | Yoda | Voice, Theme park attraction |
| 2011 | Being Elmo: A Puppeteer's Journey | Himself | Documentary |
| 2014 | I Am Big Bird: The Caroll Spinney Story | Himself | Documentary |
| 2015 | Inside Out | Subconscious Guard Dave | Voice |
| 2015 | Star Wars: The Force Awakens | Yoda | Voice (archive recording) |
| 2017 | Muppet Guys Talking: Secrets Behind the Show the Whole World Watched | Himself | Documentary |
| 2017 | Star Wars: The Last Jedi | Yoda | Puppeteer/Voice |
| 2019 | Knives Out | Alan Stevens | |
| 2019 | Star Wars: The Rise of Skywalker | Yoda | Voice only |
| 2021 | Echoes of Violence | Dante | |
| 2024 | Inside Out 2 | Mind Cop Dave | Voice |

=== Filmmaking credits ===
==== Director ====
| Year | Title | Notes |
|---|---|---|
| 1982 | The Dark Crystal | Co-directed with Jim Henson |
| 1984 | The Muppets Take Manhattan | Also writer |
| 1986 | Little Shop of Horrors | ADR Voice |
| 1988 | Dirty Rotten Scoundrels | |
| 1991 | What About Bob? | |
| 1992 | Housesitter | |
| 1995 | The Indian in the Cupboard | |
| 1997 | In & Out | |
| 1999 | Bowfinger | |
| 2001 | The Score | |
| 2004 | The Stepford Wives | |
| 2007 | Death at a Funeral | |
| 2017 | Muppet Guys Talking: Secrets Behind the Show the Whole World Watched | Documentary |
| 2020 | Derek DelGaudio's In & Of Itself | Documentary |

==== Producer ====
- The Great Muppet Caper (1981)
- Muppet Guys Talking: Secrets Behind the Show the Whole World Watched (2017)

==== Executive producer ====
- The Muppet Christmas Carol (1992)
- Muppet Treasure Island (1996)

=== Television ===
| Year | Title | Role | Notes |
|---|---|---|---|
| 1969–2013 | Sesame Street | Bert; Grover; Cookie Monster; Lefty the Salesman; Harvey Kneeslapper; Additional characters | Puppeteer/Voice, Regularly until 2001, however, he continued to perform his characters a few times a year until 2013. |
| 1975–1976 | Saturday Night Live | The Mighty Favog | Puppeteer/Voice The Land of Gorch segments |
| 1976–1981 | The Muppet Show | Fozzie Bear; Miss Piggy; Sam Eagle; Animal; Marvin Suggs; George the Janitor; Additional characters | Puppeteer/Voice |
| 1977 | Emmet Otter's Jug-Band Christmas | Alice Otter (puppetry); Chuck Stoat (puppetry and voice) | Puppeteer/Voice, Television film |
| 1989 | The Jim Henson Hour | Miss Piggy; Fozzie Bear | Puppeteer/Voice |
| 1990 | The Muppets at Walt Disney World | Miss Piggy; Fozzie Bear; Animal | Puppeteer/Voice |
| 1994 | Jim Henson's Animal Show | Sam Eagle | Voice, Episode: "Bald Eagle" |
| 1996–1998 | Muppets Tonight | Miss Piggy; Fozzie Bear; Sam Eagle; Animal; Additional characters | Puppeteer/Voice |
| 1999 | CinderElmo | Bert; Grover; Cookie Monster | Voice, Television film |
| 2015–2016 | Star Wars Rebels | Yoda | Voice, 2 episodes |
| 2022–2023 | StoryBots: Answer Time | Dink | Voice, 5 episodes |

==== As director ====
| Year | Title | Notes |
|---|---|---|
| 2002 | The Funkhousers | Television film |
| 2011 | Leverage | Episode: "The Carnival Job" |

=== Video games ===
| Year | Title | Role | Notes |
|---|---|---|---|
| 1996 | Muppet Treasure Island | Miss Piggy; Fozzie Bear; Sam Eagle | Voice |
| 1996 | The Muppet CDROM: Muppets Inside | Miss Piggy; Fozzie Bear; Animal; Sam Eagle; Marvin Suggs | Voice |
| 2000 | Muppet Monster Adventure | Miss Piggy; Fozzie Bear | Voice |
| 2000 | Muppet RaceMania | Miss Piggy; Fozzie Bear; Sam Eagle; Animal | Voice |
| 2020 | Star Wars: Tales from the Galaxy's Edge | Yoda | Voice |
| 2021 | Star Wars: Tales from the Galaxy's Edge – Last Call | Yoda | Voice |

== Awards and nominations ==
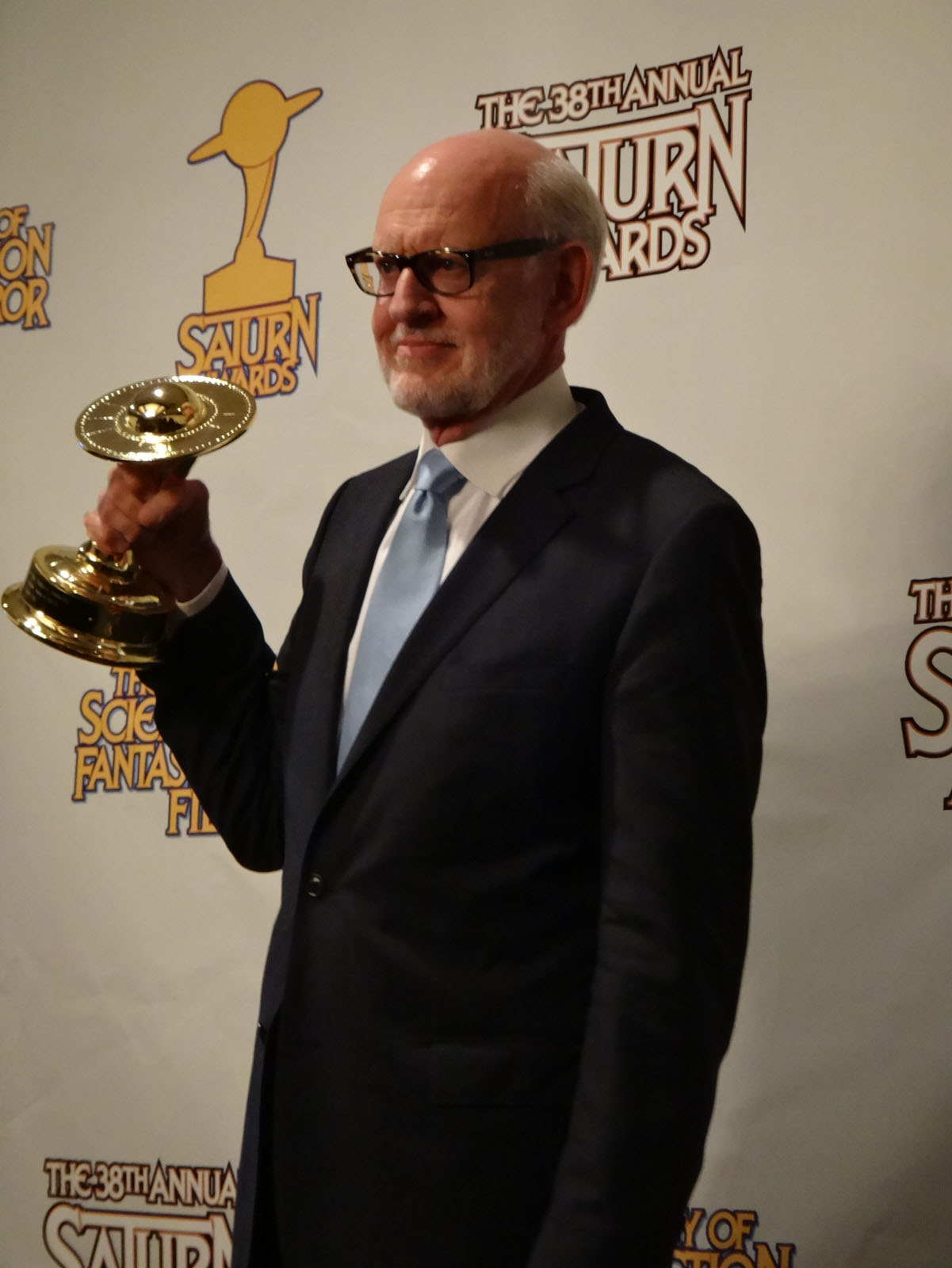
Oz receiving a Saturn Award

| Year | Award | Category | Nominated work | Result |
|---|---|---|---|---|
| 1974 | News & Documentary Emmy Award | Outstanding Individual Achievement in Children's Programming | Sesame Street | Won |
| 1976 | Daytime Emmy Award | Outstanding Children's Programming | Sesame Street | Won |
| 1976 | Grammy Award | Best Recording for Children | Merry Christmas from Sesame Street | Nominated |
| 1977 | Primetime Emmy Award | Outstanding Comedy-Variety or Music Series | The Muppet Show | Nominated |
| 1978 | Primetime Emmy Award | Outstanding Comedy-Variety or Music Series | The Muppet Show | Won |
| 1979 | Daytime Emmy Award | Outstanding Individual Achievement in Children's Programming | Sesame Street | Won |
| 1979 | Primetime Emmy Award | Outstanding Comedy-Variety or Music Program | The Muppet Show | Nominated |
| 1979 | Grammy Award | Best Recording for Children | The Muppet Show Album | Won |
| 1980 | Grammy Award | Best Recording for Children | The Muppet Movie: Original Soundtrack Recording | Won |
| 1980 | Primetime Emmy Award | Outstanding Variety, Music or Comedy Program | The Muppet Show | Nominated |
| 1981 | Primetime Emmy Award | Outstanding Variety, Music or Comedy Program | The Muppet Show | Nominated |
| 1983 | Hugo Award | Best Dramatic Presentation | The Dark Crystal | Nominated |
| 1987 | Hugo Award | Best Dramatic Presentation | Little Shop of Horrors | Nominated |
| 1998 | American Comedy Awards | Creative Achievement Award | | Won |
| 2002 | ADG Excellence in Production Design Awards | Contribution to Cinematic Imagery Award | | Won |
| 2003 | Critics' Choice Movie Awards | Best Digital Acting Performance | Star Wars: Episode II – Attack of the Clones | Nominated |
| 2012 | Saturn Awards | Life Career Award | | Won |
| 2024 | Disney Legends | Outstanding Film and Television Contributions to The Walt Disney Company | | Won |

| Preceded by None | Performer of Cookie Monster; 1969–2001 | Succeeded by David Rudman |
| Preceded by None | Performer of Bert and Performer of Grover; 1969–1998 | Succeeded by Eric Jacobson |
| Preceded by None | Performer of Marvin Suggs; 1976–1981 | Succeeded by Eric Jacobson |
| Preceded by None | Performer of Miss Piggy; 1976–2002 | Succeeded by Eric Jacobson |
| Preceded by None | Performer of Animal; 1975–2000 | Succeeded by Eric Jacobson |
| Preceded by None | Performer of Sam the Eagle; 1975–2000 | Succeeded by Kevin Clash |
| Preceded by None | Performer of Fozzie Bear; 1976–2000 | Succeeded by Eric Jacobson |
