= Raphael Regius =

Venetian humanist

Raphael Regius (/ˈriːdʒiəs/; Italian: Raffaele Regio; c. 1440 – 1520) was a Venetian humanist, who was active first in Padua, where he made a reputation as one of the outstanding Classical scholars, then in Venice, where he moved in the periphery of an elite group composed of a handful of publicly sanctioned scholars, salaried lecturers employed by the Serenissima itself: on the fringes of this elite world also moved the scholar-printer Aldus Manutius (Lowry 1979).

== Work ==
The most famous achievement of Regius is his demonstration that the Rhetorica ad C. Herennium, or Rhetorica secunda, was not written by Cicero, a milestone in the development of textual criticism. His bitter rivalry with other scholars and scorn for the "semidocti" reflect familiar competitive strains in the sometimes vituperative temper of Renaissance humanism.

Regio, or Regius as he signed himself, was doubtless a pupil of Benedetto Brugnolo, a central figure among Venetian humanists, who headed the Scuola di San Marco and delivered daily lectures at the foot of the Campanile from 1466 until he died in 1502, "universally lamented and aged over ninety" (Lowry).

In his edition of Quintilian's Institutiones Oratoria ("Institutes of Oratory") Regius was the first to attempt corrections of the numerous errors ("depravationes") in Quintilian's text. In his treatise on the text of Quintilian, the Problemata (probably 1492), he laid out his methods in textual criticism, which offer "insights that are still valid and useful for the modern textual critic," though Regius depends more on his own rationalization ("ratio") for resolution of textual difficulties than on an appreciation of the relationships among manuscripts, for which a modern scholar would strive. Regius recognized how glosses could creep into a text and corrupt it.

Regius published commentary (enarrationes) on Ovid's Metamorphoses (Venice, ca. 1518), which became the most frequently printed edition of Ovid's Latin poem in the sixteenth century.
