= Antonio Brucioli =

Italian humanist, religious thinker, publisher and writer

Antonio Brucioli (born about 1498, died 6 December 1566) was an Italian humanist, religious thinker, publisher, and writer best known for his translation of the Bible into Italian. He was the first to publish an Italian translation of Aristotle's Politics. It became mandatory reading in the academies of Padua not long after.

In 1555 his Italian translation of the Bible was placed on the Index of Forbidden Books by Pope Paul IV. He was tried for heresy, convicted, and forced to recant.

== Life ==
Brucioli was born in Florence at an unknown date. In his youth, Brucioli was a frequent attendee and contributor to the circle of humanists and scholars who met in the Orto Oricellari, a large garden in Florence. Among the distinguished thinkers with whom Brucioli developed relationships there, the names of Francesco Cattani da Diacceto, Luigi Alamanni, and Niccolò Machiavelli stand out.

In 1522 Brucioli, along with several other of the members of the Orto Oricellari, was implicated in a plot to assassinate Cardinal Giulio Medici. Fleeing the city, Brucioli took refuge in Lyon, where he began work on a collection of tracts on moral philosophy, a collection published in Venice in 1526. This body of works formed the core of his Dialogi, which he would expand over the course of the next two decades. During his stay in Lyons, he seems to have absorbed many of the religious ideas of the German reformers, adopting moderately Lutheran theology in his translation of the Bible, a work which some said relied heavily on Martin Bucer.

After the Sack of Rome and the flight of the Medici from Florence in 1527, Brucioli returned to his native city to take part in establishing the Republic of Florence. However, as a political moderate and strict believer that the Dominican friars of San Marco should keep out of state affairs, he quickly fell afoul of the dominant Savonarolan faction, being exiled from the city in 1528.

Brucioli spent much of the rest of his life in Venice, where he was twice tried for heresy. Having been first denounced in 1548 and found guilty of disseminating heretical materials (but not of heresy), he fled to the tolerant court of Ferrara and the protection of the duchess, Renée of France. From this point to the rest of his life, strictures on his ability to publish caused him great poverty. In 1549, we find him directing overtures to Cosimo I de Medici hoping to be granted a stipend in exchange for regular reports on political activities. In 1555 his Italian translation of the Bible was placed on the Index of Forbidden Books by Pope Paul IV. While in Venice he was again tried for heresy, convicted, and forced to recant. He spent most of the remainder of his life under house arrest and in extreme poverty.
