= Federico Cornaro (fl. 1419–1455) =

Federico Cornaro (fl. 1419–1455) was a Venetian patrician and humanist.

Cornaro was born around 1401. His parents were Giovanni Cornaro and Francesca di Filippo. His grandfather and namesake was Federico Cornaro, the richest man in Venice at the time of his death in 1382. He studied under Facino Ventraria beginning sometime between 1408 and 1411 and lasting until 1416. He also studied with Guarino da Verona in 1414. He was presented on 19 November 1419. He did not have a notable political career, but was elected to the Council of Forty in 1447, 1450, 1452 and 1455. He left before his term was up in 1455 to join the Ducal Council, but as there is no record of him there it is likely that he died shortly after. His political inactivity may have resulted from a focus on business, since the Cornaro family derived its wealth from commerce.

Cornaro moved in humanist circles. He corresponded with Leonardo Giustiniani, Gasparino Barzizza, Francesco Filelfo and Ambrogio Traversari. Traversari, in a letter to Francesco Barbaro, called him a "most famous youth" and Antonio Baratella, in his Policleomenareis, praised him for his learning. Of his own writings, however, only his letters to Giustiniani survive.

== Bibliography ==
- King, Margaret L. (1985). Venetian Humanism in an Age of Patrician Dominance. Princeton University Press.
