= Victoria Labalme =

American artist and producer

- Occupations: Artist; author; producer; speaker
- Years active: 1994–present
- Spouse: Frank Oz (m. 2011)
- Parents: George Labalme Jr.; Patricia Hochschild Labalme

Victoria Labalme is a performing artist, speaker, and presentation skills coach. She is the founder of Risk Forward and Rock The Room. Labalme was inducted into the Speaker Hall of Fame by the National Speakers Association in 2011.

== Early life ==
Labalme's father was George Labalme Jr., a French-born designer who was involved in the design of, among other things, the Grey Poupon mustard jar. Her father's uncle, Raymond Loewy, was also a designer and George and Raymond worked together. Her mother was Patricia Hochschild Labalme.

Labalme graduated from Stanford University, BA English Literature.

== Career ==
=== Keynote speaking, consulting and coaching ===
In 2001, Labalme began delivering speeches, workshops, and keynotes, blending her background in performing arts with business performance. She is a consultant to entrepreneurs, individuals, teams, and executives at several companies. She has delivered keynotes and workshops including The Throughline, Risk Forward and Rock The Room for Starbucks, Microsoft, PayPal, Verizon, Coca-Cola, Chase, L’Oreal, Oracle, Lowe's, universities, cultural institutions, and non-profits.

Labalme was inducted into the Million Dollar Consulting College Hall of Fame in 2015.

Labalme delivered a TEDx talk titled, Risk Forward: The Rewards of Not Knowing in 2016. She is the author of the Wall Street Journal bestseller Risk Forward.

=== Performing arts ===
Labalme's has extensive experience in the performing arts. Most recently her one-woman show, Victoria’s Grapefruit, directed by Seth Barrish, was produced at The Barrow Group in October 2022. The Barrow Group also produced her one-woman show, Icebergs in Africa, in 1998. She was honored with The Barrow Group (performing arts center) Award in May 2025.

She has appeared in television, film and on stage, including Sex & The City Caroline's on Broadway, Gotham Comedy Club, and dozens of network television commercials including a Super Bowl spot.

Labalme originated the role of Ashley in the world premiere (November 8, 1994) of off-broadway play Three Years from 30 by Mike O’Malley at The Sanford Meisner Theater. In 2000, she directed Gregg Goldston's off-Broadway One Mime Show and was featured in the Toyota Comedy Festival.

Labalme was featured in the documentary, "Bessie" directed by Academy Award winner D.A. Pennebaker and Chris Hegedus.

In 2017, Labalme conceived and produced Muppet Guys Talking: Secrets Behind The Show the Whole World Watched which premiered at SXSW. It scored 100% on Rotten Tomatoes. The documentary was met with high critical acclaim from The New York Times, The Hollywood Reporter, Los Angeles Times, Variety, Good Morning America, BBC, and The Today Show.

== Personal life ==
Labalme married performer/director Frank Oz on July 9, 2011.
