= George Labalme Jr. =

French-American soldier, industrial designer (1927–2016)

- Born: November 27, 1927; Paris, France
- Died: September 14, 2016 (aged 88); New York City, U.S.
- Occupations: Soilder; industrial designer
- Spouse: Patricia Hochschild Labalme (m. 1958; died 2002)
- Children: 4, including Victoria
- Relatives: Raymond Loewy (uncle); Frank Oz (son-in-law)

George Labalme Jr. (November 14, 1927 – September 27, 2016) was a soldier, an industrial designer, and a philanthropist.

== Early life and education ==
Labalme was born in Paris on November 17, 1927 and lived there until 1939 when he moved with his family to New York City.

After graduating from Rumsey Hall School and Hotchkiss School, he was drafted into the U. S. Army in 1946, serving first at Fort McClellan, Alabama. He was deployed with the occupation forces in Tokyo until 1947. He served as an honor guard for General Douglas MacArthur. He then attended Kenyon College on the GI Bill where he met and became lifelong friends with E. L. Doctorow.

He married Patricia Hochschild Labalme. Their path to matrimony was long and convoluted: they first met briefly in 1939 as 12-year olds when their respective families vacationed together at Eagle Nest camp. They did not see each other again until their twenties, when she was a graduate student at Harvard. Their first attempt at a wedding was cancelled, but the second, on the anniversary of D-Day, June 6, 1958, was completed. They subsequently had four children together: Jenny, Henry, Lisa (later Osterland), and Victoria. They were married until Patricia's death in 2002.

== Career ==
Labalme worked in Milan with architect/designer Gio Ponti followed by five years with industrial designer Raymond Loewy (who was also his uncle) in Paris and New York. His best-known design was the Grey Poupon mustard jar.

== Community service ==
For nine years, he was Vice President of the New York Public Library, and from 2002-14 served as a Trustee and later as President of The Jacob and Valeria Langeloth Foundation. For thirteen years he was a Trustee of The Gladys Krieble Delmas Foundation, through which he helped produce The Poetry of Light, an exhibition of 140 drawings from The National Gallery of Art, displayed at the Correr Museum in Venice in 2014-15. For many years he was Treasurer of the Renaissance Society of America and a board member of the Adirondack Museum. He donated art works to the Metropolitan Museum of Art.

== Death ==
Labalme Jr. died on September 14, 2016 at the age of 88 in New York City.
