= Cecelia Kenyon =

American political scientist

Cecelia M. Kenyon
- Born: 1923; Gainesville, Georgia
- Died: January 1990 (aged 66–67); Northampton, Massachusetts
- Education: Oberlin College; Radcliffe College
- Scientific career
- Fields: Political science
- Workplaces: Smith College

Cecelia M. Kenyon (1923 – January 1990) was an American political scientist. She was a professor at Smith College from 1948 until 1984, where from 1969 onwards she was the Charles N. Clark Professor of Government. Her theses on the American Revolution and the early American federalists emphasized the role of ideology in the creation of the American state and influenced historiography on the early United States.

== Life and career ==
Kenyon was born in 1923 in Gainesville, Georgia. She attended Oberlin College. She then studied at Radcliffe College, where she obtained a master's and a PhD. In 1948 Kenyon became a professor of government at Smith College. In 1969, she was named the Charles N. Clark Professor of Government.

Kenyon was a scholar of the American Revolution and the roles of conservatism, radicalism, and federalism in early American history. In her 1955 essay "Men of little faith: the Anti-Federalists on the nature of representative government" in The William and Mary Quarterly, Kenyon argued that the American Revolution was both essentially conservative and essentially radical, involving a rejection of some parts of the past while embracing others. This was an early study on the role of ideology in the American Revolution, which departed from previous assumptions that the Revolution had been mainly the result of material conditions. In 1966, she edited the volume The Antifederalists which collected writings opposed to the federalists around the time of the Revolution. Some of Kenyon's work was collected and analyzed in the 2003 University of Massachusetts Press book Men of little faith: Selected writings of Cecelia Kenyon. The editors of the volume argued that Kenyon's work had had a major influence on subsequent historiography of the American Revolutionary era.

Kenyon retired in 1984, and she died in Northampton, Massachusetts in January 1990.

== Selected works ==
- "Men of little faith: the Anti-Federalists on the nature of representative government", The William and Mary Quarterly (1955)
- "Republicanism and Radicalism in the American Revolution: An Old-fashioned Interpretation", The William and Mary Quarterly (1962)
- The Antifederalists, editor (1966)
