= Herbert Kubly =

American author and playwright

- Kubly in 1956
- Born: Herbert Oswald Nicholas Kubly; April 26, 1915; New Glarus, Wisconsin
- Died: August 7, 1996 (aged 81); New Glarus, Wisconsin
- Occupations: Author, playwright
- Spouse: Emily Lee Hill
- Writing career
- Notable work: American in Italy
- Notable awards: National Book Award for Nonfiction, 1956

Herbert Oswald Nicholas Kubly (April 26, 1915 – August 7, 1996) was an American author and playwright. For his first book, American in Italy, he won the 1956 U.S. National Book Award for Nonfiction.

== Biography ==
Kubly was born and raised on a farm in the Swiss American community of New Glarus, Wisconsin. He received a bachelor's degree from the University of Wisconsin School of Journalism in 1937. His first professional work as a journalist was for the Pittsburgh Sun-Telegraph. He later wrote for the New York Herald Tribune.

His first play, Men to the Sea, was produced on Broadway in 1944. Between 1945 and 1947 he served as the music critic for Time magazine.

In 1950 Kubly became an associate professor of speech at the University of Illinois, but he left that position to accept a Fulbright grant to Italy, where he spent 18 months in 1950–1951. He taught creative writing at San Francisco State College in the 1960s. From 1969 to 1984, he was an English professor and writer-in-residence at the University of Wisconsin–Parkside.

He married Emily Lee Hill in 1989. He died in New Glarus at age 81.

== Legacy ==
The University of Wisconsin–Parkside English Department established the Herbert Kubly Writing Award in 1996 in Kubly's memory.

== Books ==
- American in Italy - 1955
- Easter in Sicily - 1956
- Varieties of Love (stories) - 1958
- Italy (Life World Library) - 1961
- The Whistling Zone (novel) - 1963
- At Large (autobiographical) - 1964
- Switzerland (Life World Library) - 1964
- Gods and Heroes - 1969
- The Duchess of Glover (novel) - 1975
- Native's Return - 1981
- The Parkside Stories - 1985

== Plays ==
- Men to the Sea - 1944

The story concerns the wives of five sailors, who live at a boarding house in Brooklyn, New York while their husbands are away at sea.

- Inherit the Wind, with Waldemar Hansen - 1946

A psychological drama set in Philadelphia in 1903. A production opened in London circa 1948. (Not the play of the same name by Jerome Lawrence and Robert E. Lee.)

- Punch and Judy - 1948

About the United Nations and the possibility of world organization.

- The Cocoon - 1954

Produced in London.

- Beautiful Dreamer - 1956

A comedy about a striptease artist trying to escape the police.

- Virus - 1973

Produced at the University of Wisconsin–Parkside
