= Humanistic historiography =

Humanistic historiography is a method in historiography based on the principles of humanism, developing a higher standard of critical judgement in the study of history. The new style of humanistic historiography was established by historians of Florence, namely Leonardo Bruni in his Historiarum Florentini populi libri (published from 1416 to 1449), and the scholarly works of Francesco Petrarca, with Giovanni Villani's Istorie fiorentine being a precursor to humanistic historiography, identifying causes in human actions and motives rather than in fate. Certain characteristics of the model still determined the treatment of political history in Machiavelli's Istorie Firoentine, as well as his delimitation of political subject matter at large.

The humanists used ancient Greek and Roman historians, especially Livy, Sallust, and Julius Caesar as their models. This choice had certain consequences insofar as the treatment of history had to concentrate on such exciting events as wars and revolutions to the exclusion of the permanent factors and the long-range developments that determine the texture of history. Similar to the ancient historians, the humanists took the generic division of history seriously.

Moreover, in the interest of rhetorical and dramatic effectiveness, the individual had to become the center of action to such a degree that again the permanent determinants that in fact leave not so much room for heroic freedom were obscured.

The Roman model had, furthermore, the effect of a radical secularization of political problems. The humanistic concentration on the history of the republic in the Roman manner entailed the break with the Christian view of history. The rigidly closed stream of secular state history did not admit a divine Providence governing a universal history. Such problems as the translatio imperii and the speculation of the four world monarchies disappeared without a word of discussion.

In the eighteenth century, when Voltaire started his secularization of history, the polemic against the Christian position of Jacques-Bénigne Bossuet was of interest. The humanists of the fifteenth century ignored the Christian problem as if it did not exist.
