= Patricia Hochschild Labalme =

American historian

- Born: February 26, 1927; New York City, U.S.
- Died: October 11, 2002 (aged 75); New York City, U.S.
- Occupations: Historian; scholar; philanthropist
- Years active: 1952–2002
- Spouse: George Labalme Jr. (m. 1958)
- Children: 4, including Victoria Labalme
- Father: Walter Hochschild
- Relatives: Berthold Hochschild (grandfather); Harold K. Hochschild (uncle); Frank Oz (son-in-law)

Patricia Hochschild Labalme (February 26, 1927 – October 11, 2002) was an American historian and executive director of the Renaissance Society of America.

== Early life and education ==
Hochschild was born in New York City, the daughter of industrialist Walter Hochschild and Kathrin Samstag Hochschild. Her grandfather was Berthold Hochschild, and her uncle was Harold K. Hochschild. She graduated from the Brearley School in 1944, and graduated magna cum laude from Bryn Mawr College in 1948. At Harvard University, she earned a master's degree in 1950 and a PhD in 1958. Her dissertation on Bernardo Giustiniani, Bernardo Giustiniani: A Venetian of the Quattrocento, won the Caroline Wilby Prize.

== Career ==
Labalme taught history at Wellesley College from 1952 to 1959, and at Barnard College from 1961 to 1977. She was an adjunct professor at Hunter College in 1979, and at New York University from 1980 to 1982 and from 1986 to 1987. Labalme's publications included a book based on her dissertation, Bernardo Giustiniani, a Venetian of the Quattrocento (1969). She edited Beyond their Sex: Learned Women of the European Past (1980), a collection of essays, and A Century Recalled: Essays in Honor of Bryn Mawr College (1987). She co-edited Venice, Cità Excelentissima: Selections from the Renaissance Diaries of Marin Sanudo (2008) with Laura Sanguineti White.

Labalme was associate director of the Institute for Advanced Study from 1982 to 1988, and held other positions in leadership at the Institute until 1997. She conducted oral history interviews for the Institute, including interviews with diplomat George F. Kennan, and historians Harry Woolf, John Huxtable Elliott, and Marshall Clagett. She was executive director of the Renaissance Society of America.

Labalme served as a trustee of the Brearley School from 1978 to 1982, and a trustee of the American Academy in Rome from 1979 to 1999. She was the first female trustee of the Lawrenceville School from 1985 to 1996. As a trustee of the Gladys Krieble Delmas Foundation, she created the Venetian Research Program in 1977, to provide grants from British and American scholars studying Venice. She helped found the Friends of the Marciana Library. In 1987, Labalme received the Frances Riker Davis Award from the Brearley School.

== Publications ==
- "Identification and translation of a letter of Guarino Guarini of Verona" (article, 1955)
- Bernardo Giustiniani, a Venetian of the Quattrocento (1969)
- Beyond their Sex: Learned Women of the European Past (1980, edited collection)
- Sodomy and Venetian justice in the Renaissance (1984)
- A Century Recalled: Essays in Honor of Bryn Mawr College (1987)
- No man but an angel: Early efforts to canonize Lorenzo Giustiniani (1381-1456) (1993)
- Venice, Cità Excelentissima: Selections from the Renaissance Diaries of Marin Sanudo (2008, co-edited with Laura Sanguineti White)

== Personal life ==
In 1958, Patricia Hochschild married industrial designer and New York Public Library executive George Labalme Jr., whose uncle was Raymond Loewy. They had four children together; her daughter Victoria Labalme is an actress and speaker, married to puppeteer Frank Oz.

== Death and legacy ==
Labalme died from pancreatic cancer in 2002, aged 75 years, in New York City.

A posthumous collection of her essays was published as Saints, Women and Humanists in Renaissance Venice. (2010). Her estate contributed book collections to libraries at Seton Hall University, the American Academy in Rome, and Kenyon College. The Renaissance Society of America maintains the Patricia H. Labalme Memorial Fund for Venetian Studies, named in her memory.
