= Lawrence Justinian =

Italian Roman Catholic saint (1381–1456)

Saint Lawrence Justinian
- Patriarch of Venice
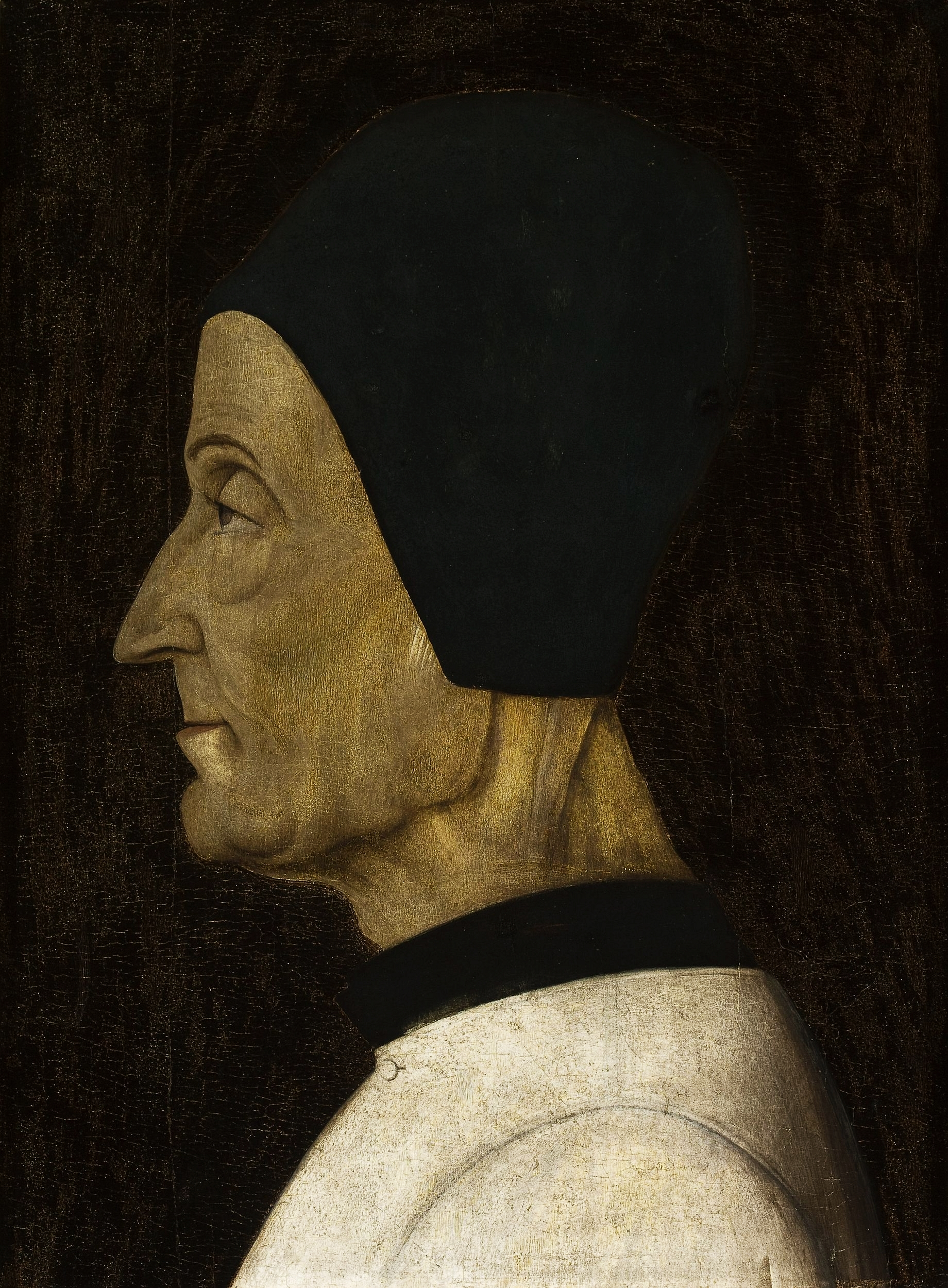
- Portrait by Gentile Bellini (1465)
- Church: Catholic Church
- Appointed: 1451
- Term ended: 1456
- Predecessor: Post established
- Successor: Maffio Contarini

Orders
- Ordination: 1407

Personal details
- Born: 1 July 1381 Venice, Republic of Venice
- Died: January 8, 1456 (aged 74) Venice, Republic of Venice
- Denomination: Roman Catholic

Sainthood
- Feast day: 8 January (Catholic Church); 5 September (General Roman Calendar 1690-1969)
- Venerated in: Catholic Church
- Beatified: 7 October 1524, Rome, Papal States by Pope Clement VII
- Canonized: 16 October 1690, Rome, Papal States by Pope Alexander VIII
- Attributes: Episcopal vestments
- Patronage: Patriarchate of Venice
- Shrines: Basilica of San Pietro di Castello

Lawrence Justinian (Italian: Lorenzo Giustiniani, 1 July 1381 – 8 January 1456) was a Venetian Catholic priest and bishop who became the first Patriarch of Venice. He is venerated as a saint by the Catholic Church.

== Biography ==
Lawrence Justinian was a member of the well-known Giustiniani family, which includes several saints. His brothers were Leonardo and Marco. The piety of his mother seems to have served as an inspiration for his own spirituality, as he chose a life of prayer and service. In 1404, after he had been ordained a deacon, at the suggestion of an uncle who was a priest, he joined a community of canons regular following a monastic form of life on the island of San Giorgio in Alga. He was admired by his fellows for his poverty, mortification, and fervency of prayer. Two years after his ordination to the Catholic priesthood in 1407, the community accepted the Rule of St. Augustine. He was chosen to be the first prior of the community.

Lawrence promoted the Constitutions which had been established for the Canons Regular of St. George, which was embraced by other communities of Canons in the region and shortly thereafter he became the Prior General of a Congregation. He was so zealous in spreading it that he was looked upon as if he were the actual founder of the Order.

In 1433, Pope Eugene IV, one of the founders of the Monastery of San Giorgio, named Gustiniani as the Bishop of Castello. He found a diocese in shambles and his administration was marked by considerable growth and reform. In 1451, Pope Nicholas V united the Diocese of Castello with the Patriarchate of Grado, and the seat of the patriarchate was moved to Venice, making Giustiniani the first Patriarch of Venice, a post that he held for over four years.

It was during Lawrence's rule that Constantinople fell to Muslim forces. Due to their centuries of close trading partnerships with Byzantine Empire, the people of Venice were in panic as to their future. He took a leading role in helping the Republic to deal with the crisis, working with the Senate to help chart its future, as well as with the clergy and people to calm them.

== Veneration ==
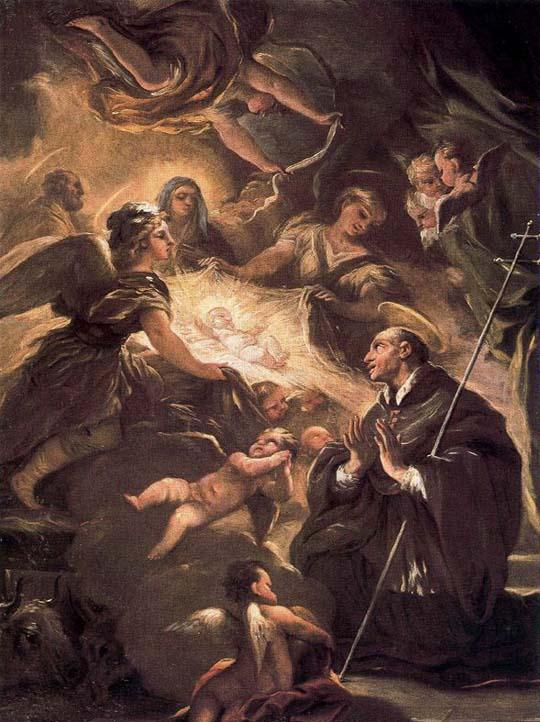
St. Lawrence Giustiniani adoring the Baby Jesus, by Luca Giordano, (17th century).

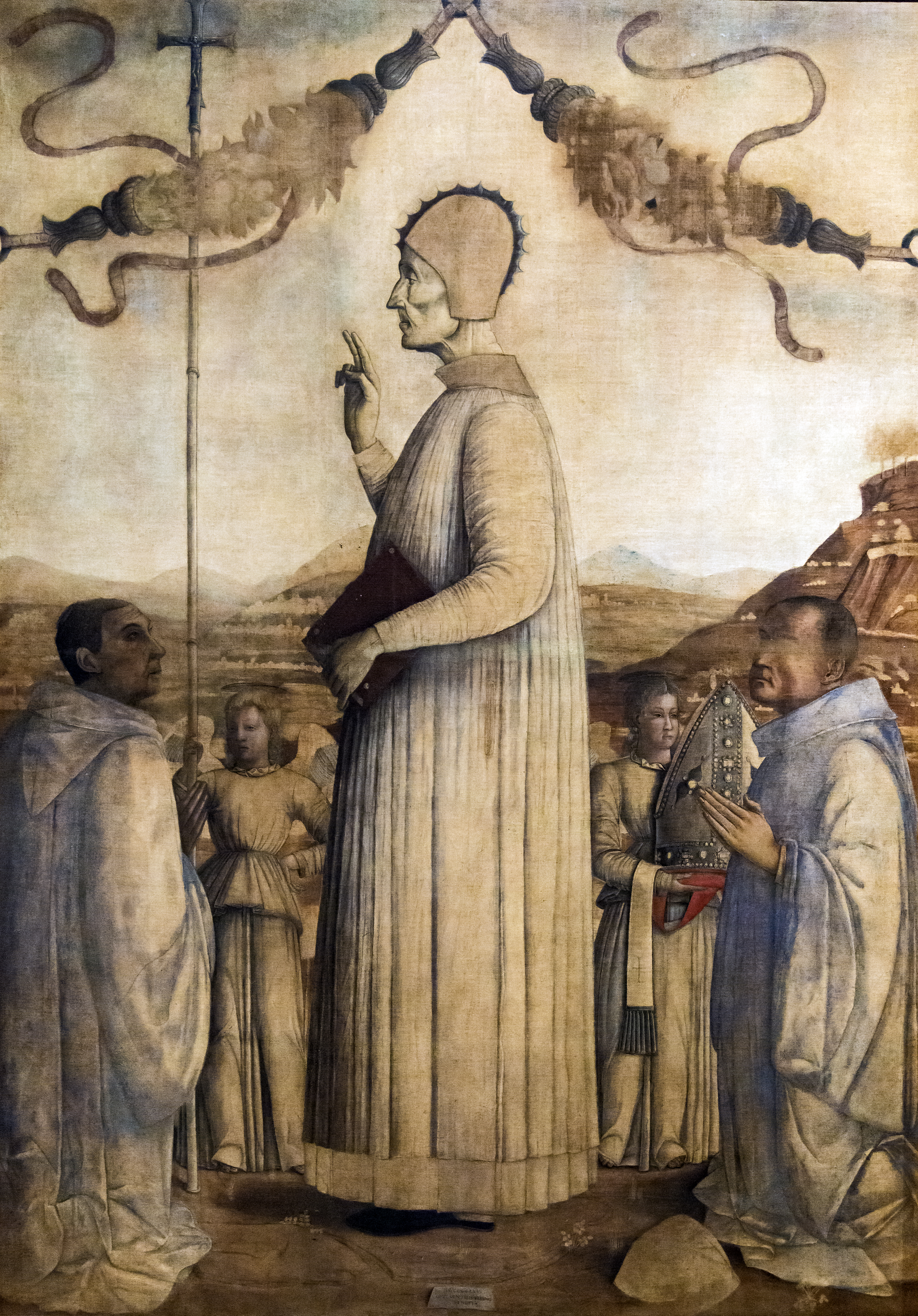
Lorenzo Giustiniani. 1465. Gallerie dell'Accademia, Venice, by Gentile Bellini

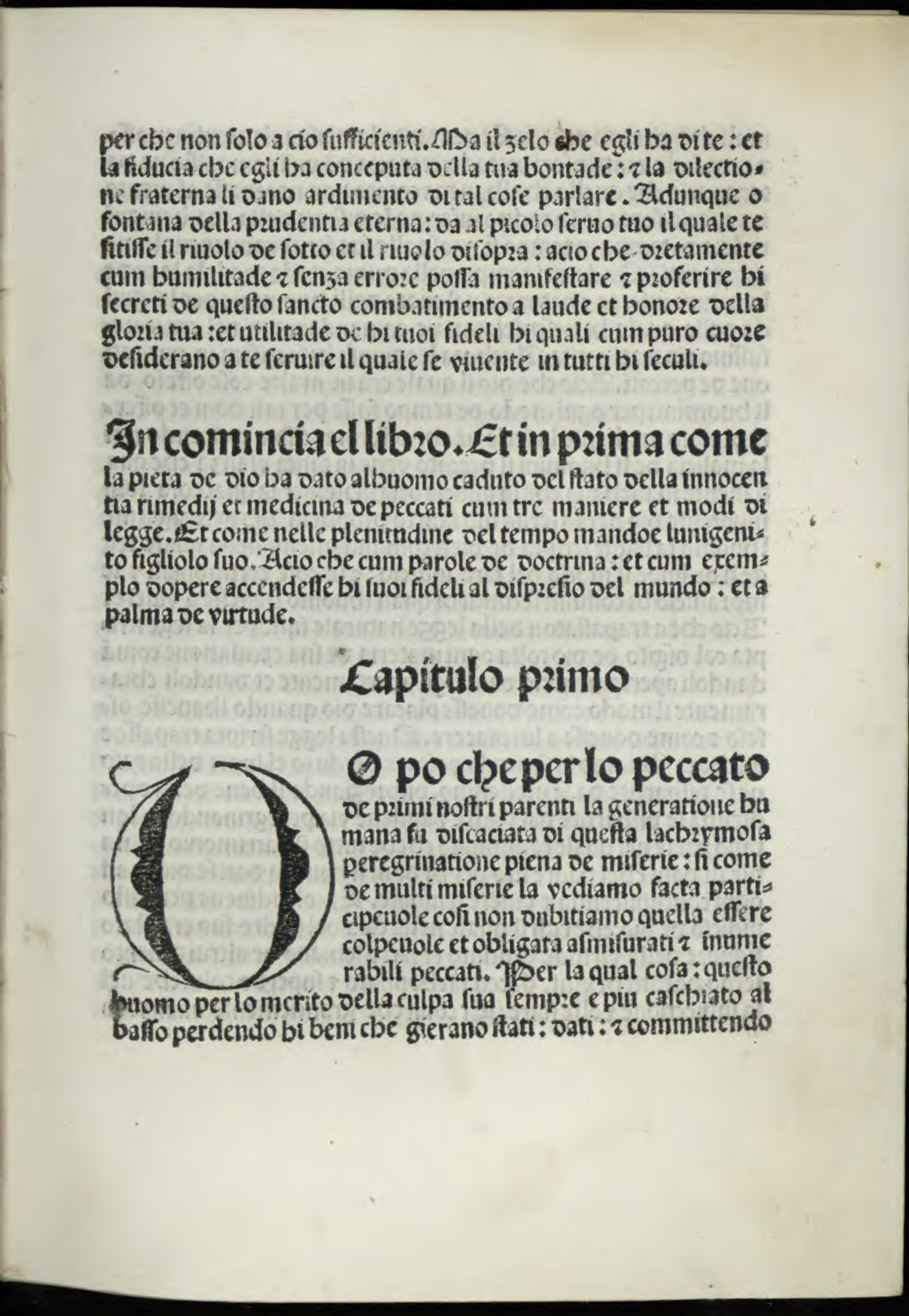
De disciplina et perfectione monasticae conversationis

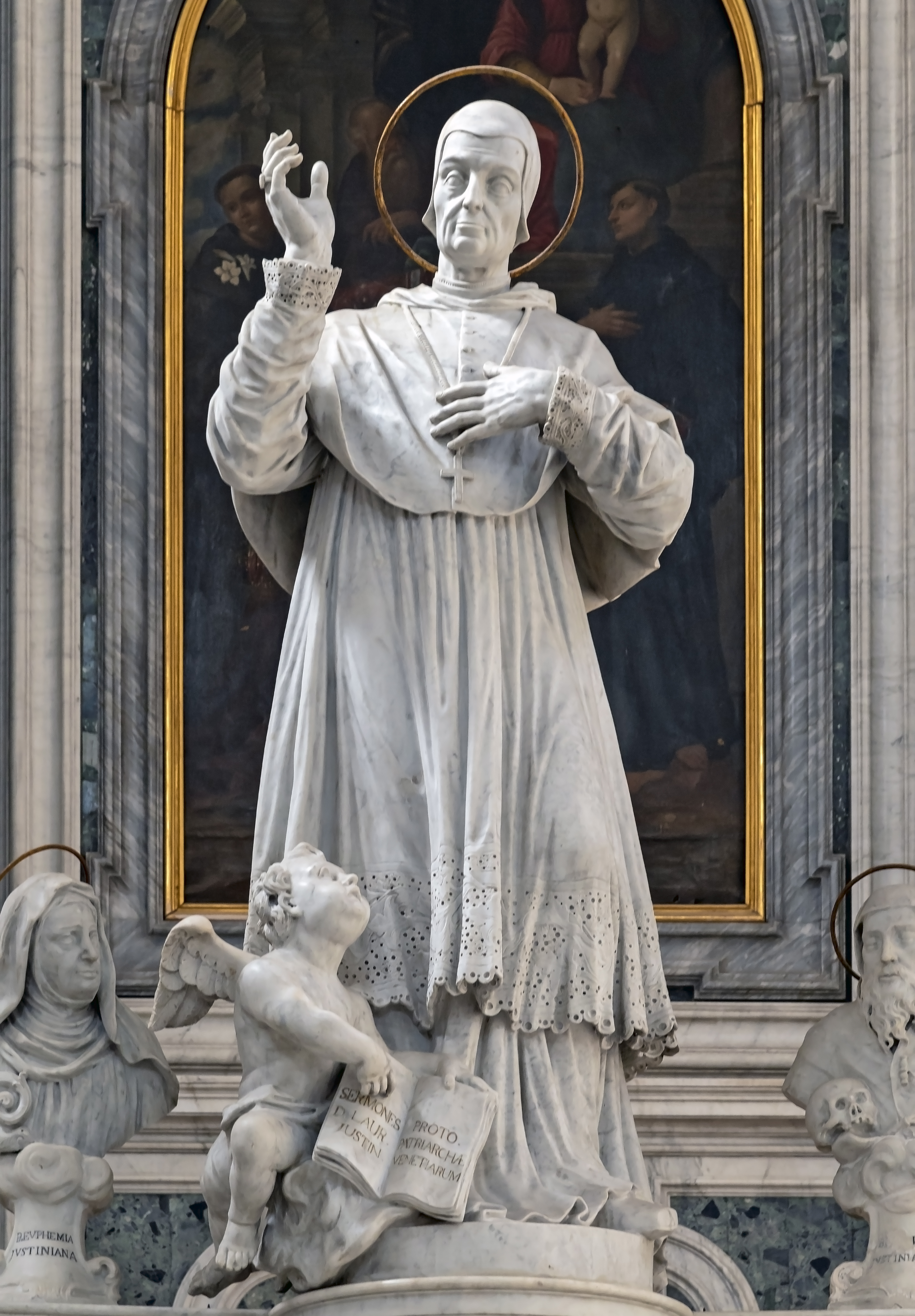
Statue of Saint Lawrence Justinian in the Cathedral of Padua

He died on January 8, 1456, in Venezia Italy. He was proclaimed saint on October 16, 1690 by Pope Alexander VIII, at the presence of Cardinal Pietro Ottoboni as procurator, assisted by Cardinal Carpegna, and of Abbot Pier Santi Fonti in quality of master of ceremonies. The Bull of Canonization was published on 4 June 1724 by Pope Benedict XIII.

Pope Innocent XII (1691–1700) inserted his feast day in the General Roman Calendar for celebration on 5 September, the anniversary of his elevation to the episcopate. Because of the saint's limited importance worldwide, his liturgical celebration is no longer included in the General Roman Calendar, and his feast was moved to 8 January, the day of his death.

His works, consisting of sermons, letters and ascetic treatises, have been frequently reprinted.

== See also ==
- Louis Barbo
