= Hochschild =

Hochschild is a surname. Notable people with the surname include:

- Adam Hochschild (born 1942), American writer; grandson of Berthold and son of Harold K.; husband of Arlie Russell
- Arlie Russell Hochschild, American sociologist; wife of Adam
- Berthold Hochschild (1860–1928), German-born American businessman; father of Harold K.
- Eduardo Hochschild (born c. 1963), Peruvian billionaire businessman
- Gerhard Hochschild (1915-2010), American mathematician
- Harold K. Hochschild (1892–1981), American businessman; son of Berthold, brother of Walter; and father of Adam
- Mauricio Hochschild (1881–1965), Bolivian tin baron
- Sali Hochschild (1883-1965), Chilean businessman
- Walter Hochschild (1901–1983), American businessman
- Zachary Hochschild (1854–1912), German businessman

== See also ==
- In mathematics, the Hochschild homology
