= Fernando Bravo James =

Bolivian politician (1912–1962)

- Born: 19 October 1912; Potosí, Bolivia
- Died: 17 November 1962 (aged 50); La Paz, Bolivia
- Resting place: Cementerio General La Paz, Bolivia
- Education: Universidad Técnica de Oruro and Universidad Mayor de San Andrés
- Occupations: Economist, senior lecturer, educator
- Known for: Militant of the Partido Obrero Revolucionario (POR); Author of the Pacto Obrero-Universitario (Worker-University Pact) antecedent of the Tesis de Pulacayo (Pulacayo Thesis); Co-author in the writing of the Tesis de Pulacayo
- Spouse: Elsa Cladera Encinas (m. 1943)
- Children: 3, including Elsa Nadezhda

Fernando Bravo James (Spanish pronunciation: [feɾˈnando ˈβɾaβo ˈxames]; 19 October 1912 – 17 November 1962) was a Bolivian politician and militant of POR (Partido Obrero Revolucionario–Revolutionary Workers' Party), a Trotskyist organization. He was an economist, senior lecturer at the Universidad Técnica de Oruro and at the Universidad Mayor de San Andrés, trade union leader and educator. He was a tireless fighter for the cause of the proletariat and the youth.

== Biography ==
=== The man ===
The father of Fernando Bravo James, doctor Zacarías Bravo Miranda, was one of the doctors who graduated from the first class of the Potosí medical school at the "Universidad Tomás Frías", founded in 1892. Fernando's mother, María James Revilla, was born in Potosí. The surname James comes from Maria's father, Benjamín James, who was of Irish origin. The couple had five children: Carmela, Sofía, Fernando, Gaby and María Luisa Bravo James. The siblings on the fathers genealogy were an older brother Esteban Bravo and on the mother's side, one younger sister and brother, Betty and Jorge López James. Bravo James did his primary studies at the "Colegio Nacional Pichincha" in Potosí. He continued his studies at the American Institute of La Paz where he graduated from high school. Fernando had many qualities: he was easy to deal with and pleasant in his conversation. He had a melodious voice and enjoyed singing with his three daughters. He composed a libretto of revolutionary songs for his party the POR, based on well-known and popular melodies, to which he wrote the lyrics.

"Those who knew him perfectly remember his eternal state of cordial serenity", writes Jaime Amonzabel. "Bravo James never adopted poses, much less contemptuous self-sufficiency toward his interlocutor. This transcendent simplicity of human affection, toward those who approached him, accompanied him throughout his life." Lucha Obrera points out Fernando's "value as an intellectual and his dynamic and rich activity amidst the masses". Fernando Bravo "was above all a Trotskyist militant. His personality was fused with the organization, the revolutionary process, the flesh and bones of the workers, as he used to say." Fernando Bravo James dedicated his life to his political ideals and he did so consistently. Elsa Cladera de Bravo testifies: "He never compromised with his principles. He fought without hesitation, unyieldingly ... he was like steel that breaks and does not bend. He had a clear concept of his duty."

=== Joining the POR ===
Bravo James "belonged to the generation that witnessed and participated in the Chaco War [1932–1935]. His spirit was shaken by the war promoted by imperialism. While still very young, on his return from the Chaco region he joined the political currents that sought an explanation and a solution to the problems of Bolivia." After his participation in that war against Paraguay, he moved to the La Joya mining site and "soon joined the nascent mining workers’ movement." It was in Oruro, that Bravo joined the POR in the 1940s, remaining active in the Trotskyist party until his death. "Indefatigable for more than 25 years, Comrade Fernando Bravo, as a militant and leader of the POR, was dedicated to the revolutionary struggles of the Bolivian masses", states Lucha Obrera.

=== Meeting Elsa Cladera Encinas ===
Elsa and Fernando met in Oruro in 1942. In that same year, on 21 December, the Catavi massacre took place. "There in the pampas that were later named 'María Barzola', troops fired on a demonstration of 8 000 people, in which women and children occupied the front lines." With this background, Elsa tells of her meeting with Fernando:

On that day, December 21, 1942, me and my fellow classmates from the Olañeta secondary school were in the Plaza 10 de Febrero; we knew that the university students would come to the demonstration, so we were waiting. Once they entered the square, we took our place on the benches in front of the prefecture. They were going to pass under the balcony of the prefecture, where the Prefect and the Colonel Cuenca were standing at a distance of twenty meters. A university student (Fernando Bravo), of regular height came forward. With his arm raised, pointing an accusing finger, he shouted:

–Down with the butcher of Catavi!

–Down! the university students answered.

Immediately the police surrounded the demonstrators, but the people formed a circle around them. We got into the circle and managed to grab Bravo from the police, and we ran until we lost sight of them, helping him escape."

Elsa Cladera de Bravo, Oruro, 1943

This was the event that captured Elsa's hearth, they were married in 1943. Fernando and Elsa had three daughters.

=== University student, senior lecturer ===
"As a university student, Fernando Bravo attended the students National Congresses and held leading positions, in which he promoted the alliance of students and mine workers" In 1943 he became General Secretary of the Center for Economic Sciences Students of the Universidad Técnica de Oruro.

Bravo James graduated as a financial auditor in 1945 and obtained his Bachelor of Arts degree in Economics in 1949 from the Universidad Técnica de Oruro. He was one of the senior lecturers "forged in the own classrooms and whose merit is indisputable", writes Barrón Feraudi. "Fernando Bravo James ... was a high-carat intellectual, honest politician and relentless social fighter who sided with the popular masses. As an instructor of General and National Economic Geography for more than seven years, both his broad knowledge and his youthful teaching ardor were evident. In 1956 he moved to La Paz, where as a result of a tough competitive examination he was chosen to teach the same subject at that city's university in the faculty of Economics". Fernando Bravo James also lectured on Historical Materialism at the Universidad Obrera de Oruro from 1950 to 1956. He was a senior lecturer in Economic Sciences at the Universidad Mayor de San Andrés in La Paz from 1956 to 1962.

=== Tireless fighter for the cause for the proletariat and youth ===
==== Labor-University Pact antecedent of the Pulacayo Thesis ====
"From 1942 on, Fernando Bravo shared in the conflicts and struggles of the mine workers", writes Lucha Obrera. "He participated in the organization of the Federación Sindical de Trabajadores Mineros de Bolivia (FSTMB–Bolivian Mine Workers Union federation), not only in organizational tasks but also in the ideological orientation of the miners." "On [July 29], 1946 he signed the Pacto Obrero -Universitario [Worker–University Pact] in Catavi. This accord was worked out on the basis of a program that he had prepared; it was the first time that a pact of this kind was made. In addition to many demands related to the mining and university sectors, its must fundamental point was the call to nationalize the mines which was the key national objective throughout this period", notes Elsa Cladera de Bravo. "Until now nobody has cited... the university–mining Pact of July 1946 as an immediate antecedent of the "Thesis of Pulacayo" thus one of the indispensable premises of the Thesis has been overlooked", points out Guillermo Lora.

The worker–university Pact signed in 1946

The Pact between the FSTMB (Federación Sindical de Trabajadores Mineros de Bolivia) and the University Federation of Oruro.

The representatives of the FSTMB and the delegates of the revolutionary University Committee of Oruro have signed the following university–worker agreement as a condition for the resumption of work in the mines; further guaranteeing this pact is its endorsement by the General Secretary of the University Federation of Oruro.

1) The workers element of the mines support the university students of the University of Oruro as long as the later do not deviate from the revolutionary line established by the program of principles of the FUL (Federación Universitaria Local) and by the present agreement. The FSTMB will resort to direct mass action to guarantee strict compliance with its goals.

2) The university element is committed to fight using all means necessary for the realization of the points supported by the FSTMB in the present pact.

University Students and Miners agree on the following:

3) Fight against the "ROSCA" [The economic and political elite dominated by the mine barons Patiño, Hochschild and Aramayo] and its agents to prevent them by all necessary means from seizing the power.

4) Organization of Mixed Student Worker Committees, to control the revolutionary situation created.

5) Impose the points approved in the Third Congress of Miners:

a) Sliding scale of wages.

b) Sliding scale of working hours.

c) Collective contract.

d) Elimination of the company–store system; readjustment and regulation of consumer supply.

e) Freedom of assembly, organization, press and propaganda.

f) Strict compliance with all laws and decrees that benefit the working classes established by the previous government.

g) Cancellation of the unionization office of the Ministry of Labor.

6) Direct worker-university control over mine administration.

7) Full guarantees of the rights of leaders and members of the FSTMB for union and university organizations.

8) The right to organize for public employees in general and particularly for members of the National Teachers' League.

9) Restoration of Educational Autonomy.

10) The workers will be represented on the Governing Board by members democratically chosen by the trade–union organizations (FSTMB, RAILWAY WORKERS, GRAPHIC WORKERS, DRIVERS and OTHERS).

11) Distribution of arms to the workers as a means to fight for the defense of social legislation laws against the moves by the "ROSCA" and to fight for social revolution.

12) Formation of the proletarian united front.

13) Complete working–class control of the Workers' Insurance and Savings Fund as well as the railway workers', teachers' and similar retirement systems.

Fernando Bravo James, La Patria, Oruro (30 July 1946)

As noted the Worker–University Pact was the antecedent of the "Thesis of Pulacayo". It states that the workers and the university students will fight together against the "ROSCA". It puts forward a series of social demands, such as the creation of student committees, the sliding scale of wages, the regulation of working hours, collective bargaining, workers control, trade–union independence, educational autonomy, the proletarian united front and weapons for the workers as a measure in the defense of social legislation.

==== The "Thesis of Pulacayo" is written ====
In 1946, the Encinas family's house at the corner of Ayacucho and Presidente Montes streets in Oruro would play a historical role related to the advancement of the burgeoning mine proletariat. Elsa Cladera de Bravo testifies, that it was in this house that the miners political program the Thesis of Pulacayo, was written. In an interview with Elsa, at the "Hôpital Cantonale" in Fribourg, Switzerland, in 2001, I inquired about the writing of the Thesis of Pulacayo. She said that "It was written in my house, and among those who participated in this were: Barrientos from Cochabamba and Ayala Mercado". I asked if Fernando Bravo participated in writing it, and Elsa replied: "he also contributed, but Lora... wanted to be known as the sole author of the Thesis of Pulacayo." However, Bravo James "was part of the team that developed the famous Thesis of Pulacayo", testifies the editor of Lucha Obrera. In summary "the party developed the Thesis of Pulacayo for the miners of Llallagua to present it", John writes, quoting Hugo González.

It was at the mine workers Congress in Pulacayo on 8 November 1946, that the "Thesis of Pulacayo" was presented. "Two of the youngest and most active members of the POR attended the Congress; Guillermo Lora ... and Fernando Bravo", writes James Dunkerley, "Lora and Bravo ... managed to obtain the support of an extensive political resolution". Dunkerley refers to the Thesis of Pulacayo which he describes as "in essence, an adaptation to the Bolivian situation of the Transitional Program written by Trotsky in 1938."

As for its approval, it was Fernando Bravo who "defended the thesis and ... got it approved in the mines..., because he was in touch with the working class, as a trade unionist, as a teacher and on that basis he had the thesis approved. It was [he] who got it approved", Elsa adds. It was Elsa Cladera de Bravo who transcribed the original of the Thesis of Pulacayo, her daughter Emma Bolshia states in an interview with Sándor John for his book Bolivias Radical Tradition. Permanent Revolution in the Andes. In another interview, in the aforementioned book, Hugo González, leader of the POR group, in which Fernando Bravo was active after the split of the party in the 1950s, alludes to a song about the Thesis of Pulacayo. Fernando's literary skills in the composing of the lyrics to the POR's song have already mentioned. This is the song he composed for song about the thesis of Pulacayo:

LLallagua

Llallagua land of mine/ your unions,/ with the Poristas/ gave us the Thesis/ of Pulacayo./

From your miners/ comes the breath and inspiration/ for the struggle/ for the workers government./

You are the pride/ of Bolivia,/ with Siglo XX/ and your Catavi/ in the front line./

La la la la la.

Fernando Bravo James, Catavi (1944–1950)

==== Participation in the 1956 national elections ====
In 1956 the POR-Lucha Obrera decided to participate in the national elections. "Political personalities such as Fernando Bravo, who was joined by González, undertook a high–level campaign against the MNR," according to Dunkerley. However the intention seems to have been different: "They said they were going to announce the candidacy simply to take advantage of the situation, that moment of the elections, to make all the political propaganda possible, because they had no opportunity to carry out widespread ... It is then that Fernando worked as never before with the militants to bring propaganda to all the mines", says Elsa Cladera de Bravo. The POR–Lucha Obrera nominated Hugo González for the presidency and Fernando Bravo James for the vice presidency.

In the June 1977 interview, Marcelo Quezada, asks Elsa about the 1956 elections and also about Fernando Bravo's qualifications as a candidate for the vice presidency:

—"He was a vice presidential candidate [in 1956]?", asks Marcelo Quezada.

—"Yes, with González", answers Elsa.

—"Was he a well-known person? What were the reasons for choosing him for the vice-presidential candidacy? Had Fernando ever been an active trade-unionist?" asks Marcelo Quezada.

—"He was politically well–known in his party. He was a very respected man, a capable man, a man with a clear vision, an honest man, and he also had a long experience of political struggle, and that is why he was prominent in his party", answers Elsa.

—"Did you participate in the election campaign?" asks Marcelo Quezada.

—"Yes, yes. I participated a great deal working together with my husband! I was really active in encouraging people to support us in Oruro", answers Elsa.

Elsa Cladera de Bravo, interviewed by Marcelo Quezada, Fribourg, Switzerland, 1977

==== The Fifth Congress of the Fourth International, October 1957 ====
In September 1957 Fernando travels to Paris as a delegate of his party to the Congress of the Fourth International. He embarks in Buenos Aires and, on the ship, he writes:

Dear Elsiña, Nadezhda, Bolshia and Alexandra:

We are on our way to Dakar, we have not seen land for three and a half days and we will reach the African coast tomorrow afternoon, where I will post this letter. I look forward to hearing from you upon my arrival in Paris ... Again, I hope that everything has been worked out smoothly. I am constantly worried about your economic situation; even more so since things are so different here. The poverty people lives in there is terrible and getting worse. We have every reason in the world to be a rebellious people and to be so until radical changes are imposed. I certainly wished you could come with me on this trip! There are so many children around me, enjoying this voyage! But that just cheers us upp! The time will come! ...

With love, kisses and my best memories. Fernando

PS: I'm half naked and dripping with sweat! It's hot!

Fernando Bravo James, 9 September 1957

Fernando brought a lot of news from his trip to Europe. From France came political and cultural news, together with the enthusiasm that marked his voyage. He also brought back an album of songs sung by Yves Montand with melodies like "Les Temps des cerises" "Le Chant des partisans"; as well as glasses, a gift from Ernest Mandel for the family. From Spain he transmitted the impression of a retrograde country living under Franco's dictatorship.

==== Educator ====
Fernando Bravo was a man with a positive attitude toward life. He always relied on changes to improve the world politically, socially and economically. "Fully aware of the reality of his people and its multiple problems, he easily transmitted his accumulated experience in words." At school, "his work was carried out with enthusiasm, colleagues appreciated him for his simplicity and sincerity, the students valued him because he was a hard working, optimistic teacher, full of initiatives and faith in the transformations that would take place in Bolivia and in the world", writes Elsa Cladera de Bravo. In a speech he gave to colleagues and students at the "Ildefonso Murguía" school, in Oruro, he expresses several of his ideas about teaching. He talks about school: "Every school is a community in which the organizing process is indispensable, involving a tremendous amount of work, importance and power. In our opinion children should organize their own life at school, in order to develop these collectivist traits". He compares school to a small society and emphasizes the importance of creating a "way of working". In terms of student organization, the concept of autonomy is of special importance, as it signifies the responsibility with which the students will act. He explains these characteristics with regard to:

School Organization

If each of you lived by oneself, you would not know how to meet your individual needs. You could not eat; you would have no shoes or clothes to wear. One person cannot fulfill the functions of a farmer, a baker, a shoemaker a tailor, etc., at the same time. Actually, you would cease to exist. We can only live and develop because we live in society, collectively, because some people's work benefits others. For example, in order for you to put on the shoes that you wear, the farmer and the tanner have been working far from where you live. Then in a shoe factory, dozens of workers carry out their labor in order for that pair of shoes to be ready to wear; and finally, the salesman or saleswoman in a store sells it to us. It's similar with every type of clothing that you wear. Each of us depends on the work of many thousands of people, whom we do not even know. In school, which is a small society of children and teachers, the same thing happens. We can only study and learn our lessons by collaborating with one another, us students and teachers. But just as in society as a whole, things must be organized in an orderly manner in order to work out better, so too does our work at school. That is why it is important to create a way of working, with enthusiasm, cheerfulness and determination, in order to obtain the best results...

Within the organization itself, children will be able to act with full freedom and autonomy; that is education carried out under their own responsibility. Its objective is to relieve the teacher of the burden of ensuring order. Providing suggestions and relying on the advice of a mature mind the guiding authority can express itself much more vigorously under these conditions than is the case with simple mechanisms of pure school discipline. On this basis we will be able to educate ourselves in an integral —that, is complete— way. Not only do we come to school to learn the lessons, but, above all to forge our character, to endow ourselves with moral sources that allow us to face all the problems that life puts in front of us and overcome them in a courageous and just manner.

Fernando Bravo James, Oruro, (Possible 1950–1956)

==== Teachers' strike, 1962 ====
In 1962 Fernando Bravo became seriously ill. In spite of his fragile state of health, he continued with the union struggle of the teachers that turned into a strike in 1962. As the leader of the teachers of La Paz, Fernando organized and led the strike. "He served as Chairman of the Strike Committee ... The doctors prescribed absolute rest. But he could not agree to that and would not abandon the fight. Disobeying the doctors, he continued to lead the strike." Meanwhile, "in this movement new methods of struggle were introduced, such as 'lightning rallies' in plebeian neighborhoods and throughout the city. The objective was to incorporate the population into strike for the teachers', that is, to link the strike to the population itself. The success of the strike was due especially to this social bond", writes Elsa Cladera de Bravo. The "lightning rallies" consisted of groups of teachers who suddenly appeared in a certain place and start holding forth loudly, like traveling minstrels in the Middle Ages. After this quick appearance, it would be the turn of another group in another place. The "lightning" rallies held by the strikers' actions groups were synchronized in such a way that when one group had finished its mission, another group started elsewhere. This made police vigilance impossible. The police could not know where the different action groups would show up and could not be at all the different locations where the 'rallies' were held.

==== Fernando Bravo James lives in the thoughts and hearts of Trotskyist militants ====
The death of Fernando Bravo James was "a tragic blow for the nation, his personality and his record as a fighter were known to all the worker and student sectors. The burial of his remains was therefore a political event", stated Lucha Obrera. "The University opened the doors of the Rector's Hall of Honor and there posthumous tributes were made to his memory from different sectors, students including those from the university, peasants, political and union leaders, Trotskyist militants, sympathizers and friends went there to say goodbye". The urban teachers' union decreed national mourning for eight days including a 24–hours work stoppage. The Faculty of Economics of the Universidad Técnica de Oruro, of which he had been Senior Lecturer, declared itself to be in mourning for his death.

In the Hall of the Universidad Mayor de San Andrés in La Paz, where the funeral bier was located, an honor guard of POR militants and FSTMB members carried out a 24–hour shift. The university departments in which Fernando Bravo had worked made their presence felt in the university atrium. Lucha Obrera published an interesting report about the funeral:

The funeral

As the transfer of his remains began, speakers at the entrance of the Universidad Mayor de San Andrés included: The dean of the Faculty of Economic Sciences, Dr Nava Morales, whose message was delivered on the behalf of that department and the entire University; Hugo González Moscoso, General secretary of the POR...; Jaime Bravo, on behalf of the Federation of Urban Teachers of La Paz; a representative of the Student Center of the Faculty of Economics and the delegate of the Central Obrera Boliviana. The coffin, carried by POR, university and union leaders, was taken through a street covered in flowers, to the sound of a funeral march played by the Waldo Ballivian Regiment's band.

About three thousand people accompanied the coffin, including teachers, students from various schools and from the university, union leaders, workers, peasants who expressed reflected deep sorrow. A bouquet of red gladioli was placed on the coffin. The coffin containing Comrade Bravo's remains was carried on shoulders from the university up to the "Comibol" building, where speeches were delivered by Dr. Octavio Lazo de la Vega representing the Centro de Acción Potosina, and by Comrade Enrique Salinas, delegate of the Federación Sindical de Trabajadores Mineros de Bolivia (FSTMB). From there, the funeral procession was driven to the cemetery, where additional speeches were delivered before the funeral niche. Comrade José Navarro spoke on behalf of the workers' cells of the party, followed by teachers’ leader Villarroel, who deposited a bouquet of red carnations. Finally, Trotskyist youth leader José Moreno gave the last tribute and fulfilled Comrade Fernando Bravo's will, wrapping his body with the Red flag of the POR... and the Fourth International, on which Comrade Bravo himself had painted the hammer and sickle, with the number four of the Fourth International. Then the clarion call was heard. The comrades concluded by cheering the party, the Fourth International and our dead comrade.

"Sepelio de los restos del camarada Bravo", Lucha Obrera, La Paz (February 1963).

There were numerous words of posthumous tribute addressed to Fernando Bravo James by labor, academic, political, civic organizations. Among these the simple and emotion-filled words of: the FSTMB's Enrique Salinas stand out: "The miners, through their bloody struggles, were always guided by the selfless orientation of this great revolutionary, which is why we feel this irreparable loss, as the cadres of his party and his greiving family feel, but we are sure that the principles which he upheld, and for which he fought tirelessly throughout his life, will be an incentive for Bolivia's exploited masses to carry through their destiny".

Central Obrera Boliviana representative Sabino Tito Atahuichi said: "Comrade Fernando, I remember how in the sexenio [the repressive period of 1946–1952] you were constantly on the run, always persecuted, banished many times, but always sure of the wonderful loyalty of your wife, family and comrades in the struggle. Fernando, you sealed the unity of Bolivia's teachers with the workers of our country, in the general strike 1950, when you found jail far preferable to giving up the fight... Lastly, the Central Obrera Boliviana, where we often heard your wise and thoughtful words, wants to tell you this: Fernando, rest in peace, your ideals which are as beautiful as your frank smile, have found place among new union cadres and in the heart of the people."

Cecilio Alcón, representative of POR–Lucha Obrera said: "Comrade Bravo is dead! Like all the idealists, you comrade Fernando have sometimes been misunderstood, perhaps by those known as well as unknown to you, but it must comfort us to say that your life requires no argument; your name has entered the history struggles alongside those of other revolutionary fighters who have contributed their share of work, faith and indomitable perseverance to lay the groundwork for the social edifice of the future. Comrade Fernando, you did not vacillate, nor did you give in. We can proudly say you have died on your feet! Honor and glory to Comrade Bravo James!"

The representative of the Economic Students of the Universidad Mayor de San Andrés: "We, the university students with whom you shared moments of comfort, encouraging each of us to advance and excel; you who with great hopes taught us the true love of the motherland ... who knew how to cultivate hopes for a better tomorrow, today with our hearts full of pain we feel an unfillable void as will no longer hear your words of encouragement, but your imperishable memory will remain. Teacher, you will live in our memory because memory is the only paradise from which we cannot be banished".

Lastly, we will cite some fragments from the heartfelt words of José Antonio Borda:

Fernando Bravo James died suddenly, clothing in mourning the flags of struggle of Bolivian trade unionism. The brief and cold lacerating news of the teacher's dead dalt a deep bound to all in the ranks of the Bolivian proletariat, in which Bravo James served as a soldier always to take upp the battle for social demands... The nations teachers, the university, the miners, listened attentively to the vibrant words of this fighter who never gave up, never lowered his flag....

He made teachers' unionism in particular a fortress for demanding bread, culture and housing for the Bolivian teachers; from that fortress he denounced betrayal, duplicity and opportunism. Moreover, it is in that fortress that his physical existence has come to an end, as he set an example of firmness and honesty.

Fernando Bravo James will be an upright example of the type of revolutionary and incorruptible leader that shaped his own path....

He was a knight of the spirit who fought at all times against the adversity that drove the masses to despair: he was a hard–driving revolutionary who had no truck with anything would lessen the possibilities of the popular victory over imperialism and national betrayal. In that indomitable spirit, he heeded the call of the Educational Reform contributing to its greatest days from the rostrum of the Universidad Técnica de Oruro in accordance with the most advanced revolutionary thinking.

His left–wing political affiliation did not diminish the moral and ideological context in which he put himself at the service of the Bolivian proletariat....

From Cochabamba, whose streets not long ago witnessed his restless figure, attentive to the pulse of the people, comes with painful haste through the silent frozen spaces, the mute voice of farewell from those who once marched with him in the fight.

José Antonio Borda, "Falleció Fernando Bravo James: Docente y luchador sindical", El Mundo, Cochabamba, 20 November 1962

In 1963, at the Teachers Congress held in Santa Cruz, a school was named after Professor Fernando Bravo James, in accordance with the desires of the members of the teaching profession. A resolution in favor of this measure had been presented to the Minister of Education Guzmán Galarza, who issued a ministerial decision by giving the name of Fernando Bravo James to small three courses school operating beyond the Bologna forest in La Paz. The resolution was delivered to his widow, Professor Elsa Cladera de Bravo, in a public ceremony at the Casa Social del Maestro, when Dr. Max Reyes was executive secretary. In expressing her thanks to this, Elsa highlighted the work of her husband.

Currently the school does no longer exist. In 1972, during the dictatorship of Hugo Banzer, his name was removed and replaced with that of Rosemary Galindo de Barrientos (widow of former dictator René Barrientos). However, later Virginia Aramayo de Portocarrero (teacher and director working with Fe y Alegría: a Bolivian Branch of a Latin American popular education movement) gave the name of Fernando Bravo James to an establishment of Fe y Alegría. Currently the Unidad educativa Fernando Bravo James in the city of El Alto, Bolivia provides classes at all levels from initial education to secondary school.

== Publications ==
Selected writings

Bravo James, Fernando (1944). Bolivia ante la historia. Universidad Técnica de Oruro. (Awarded study in a contest at the Faculty of Economic Sciences of the "Universidad Técnica de Oruro").

Bravo James, Fernando (1944–1950). "Cuaderno de canciones del Comité local de Catavi del POR, Partido Obrero Revolucionario" (Secc. Boliviana de la IV Internacional). Ediciones Lucha Minera:Secretaría de publicaciones.

Bravo James, Fernando, "Se firmó el pacto obrero universitario", La Patria (30 July 1946).

Bravo James, Fernando, "Entre mineros y universitarios", La Patria (25 March 1949).

Bravo James, Fernando (1951). "Lineamientos Geo-económicos y sociales". In Armando Rosas García, Fernando Bravo James, Liberato Ignacio López, Julio Bahoz Ramírez & Julio César Mier M., Informe de la delegación de egresados de la promoción de 1950, sobre la visita a las facultades de Ciencias económicas de Buenos Aires y Montevideo. Revista Económica, Nos. 7 and 8. Universidad Técnica de Oruro: Centro de estudios financieros, pp. 125–151.

Bravo James, Fernando, "Comunicado. Pide que la Confederación Nacional de Maestros se pronuncie sobre los últimos acontecimientos", La Patria (18 April 1952).

Bravo James, Fernando (1954). La revolución boliviana y la educación. Universidad Técnica de Oruro.

Bravo James, Fernando (1956a). Curso de geografía económica general. Universidad Técnica de Oruro.

Bravo James, Fernando (1956b). Curso de geografía económica nacional. Universidad Técnica de Oruro.

Bravo James, Fernando, "La organización de la escuela" (the organizing of the school) without date (Possible written in Oruro, between 1950 and 1956).

Bravo James, Fernando. "Canciones del CETA" (Centro Estudiantil Tupac Amaru) without date (Possible written in La Paz, between 1957 and 1962).
