= Elsa Cladera de Bravo =

Bolivian trade union leader and educator (1922–2005)

- Born: María Rosaura Elsa Cladera Encinas; February 3, 1922; Oruro, Bolivia
- Died: June 27, 2005 (aged 83); Fribourg, Switzerland
- Resting place: Cementerio General, La Paz
- Occupations: Teacher, trade unionist
- Known for: Representations: Delegate at the Asamblea del Pueblo (1971); Leader of the teachers organization in Bolivia (1964–1971); Member of the leadership of the Alianza de Liberación de la Mujer Americana (ALMA); Co-founder of the Unión de Mujeres de Bolivia (UMBO); Representative of UMBO at the Women's World Conference (1972)
- Spouse: Fernando Bravo James (m. 1943; died 1962)
- Children: 3, including Elsa Nadezhda

María Rosaura Elsa Cladera Encinas de Bravo (Latin American Spanish: [maˈɾi.a roˈsawɾa ˈelsa klaˈðeɾa enˈsinas ðe ˈβɾaβo]; née Cladera Encinas; February 3, 1922 – June 27, 2005) was a Bolivian trade union leader and educator, leader of the teachers organisation in Bolivia, delegate at the Asamblea del Pueblo in 1971, engaged in the work for women's emancipation.

== Biography ==
=== Social and political awareness ===
Both of Elsa Cladera Encinas’ parents belonged to well known families in Oruro. Her father, Carlos Cladera Zelada was a lawyer, mayor of Oruro and member of the Supreme Court. He was among the pioneers who were in favor of the nationalization of the Standard Oil Company. Elsa's grandfather, Froilán Cladera Cabanero, was the founder of the Faculty of Law at the Universidad Técnica de Oruro and the first vice-chancellor there. When young, Elsa had worked as her father's assistant at the tribunal. Elsa's mother, Florinda Encinas San Martín, was from a wealthy family in Oruro. Both her mother and her great-aunt, Dorotea Encinas, provided advice and financial help to people who were in need. Therefore, Elsa learned the importance of sharing with others from her mother and her great-aunt. The seeds of Elsa's social awareness were sown both by the quest for justice on the part of her father and by the generosity of her mother.

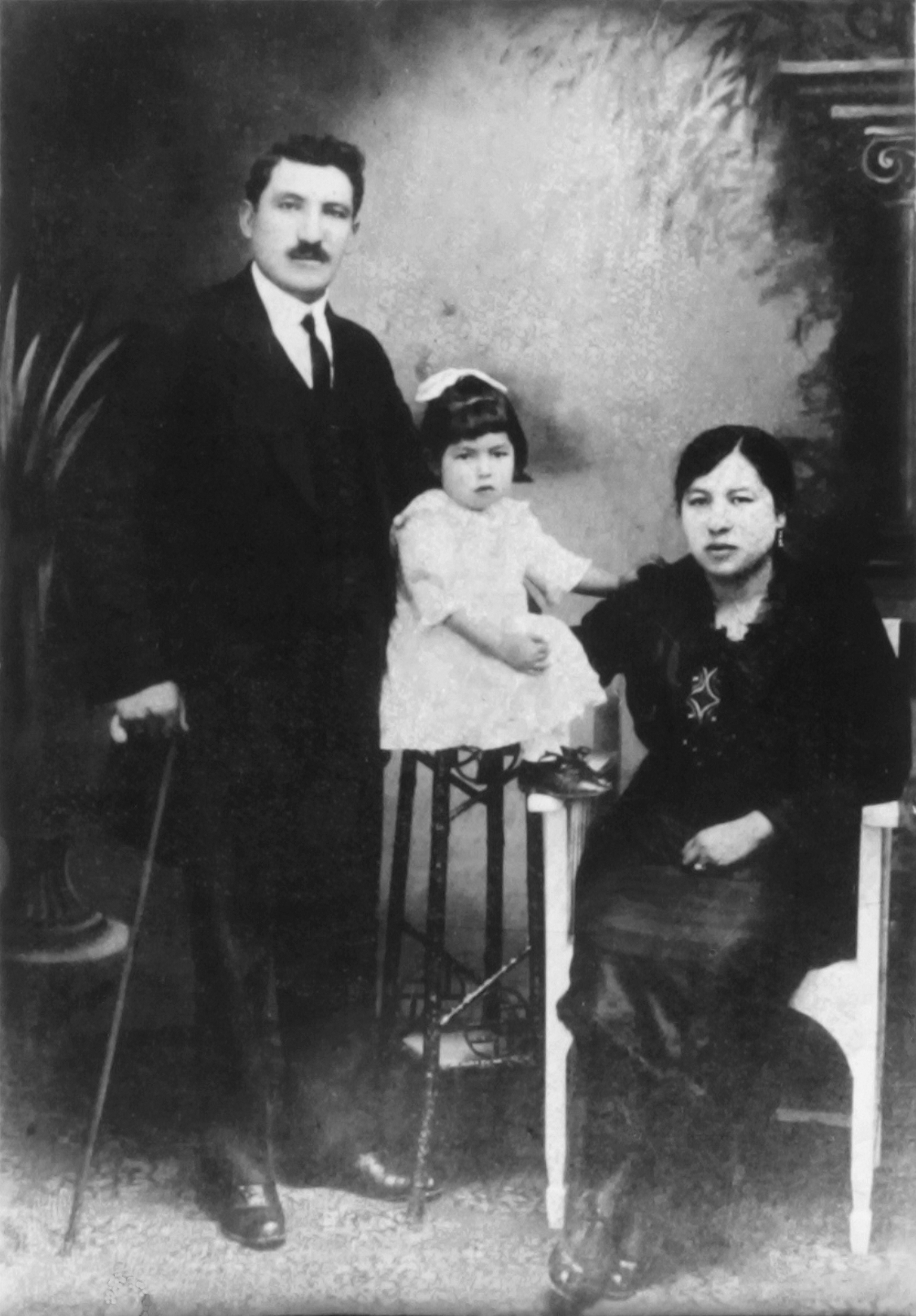
Elsa and her parents. Carlos Cladera Zelada, Elsa Cladera Encinas, Florinda Encinas San Martín

The working and living conditions of the miners in Oruro around 1942-1952 were a further factor in raising Elsa's political and social consciousness. During this time Elsa had watched the miners’ demonstrations as they came down from the mines around Oruro voicing their demands for social justice. Elsa attended left groups with other young people where they discussed workers’ power, social and political justice. She was then able to fully appreciate the nature of the demands of the miners.

A third factor that consolidated her social and political awareness was her meeting with Fernando Bravo James (Potosí 1912-La Paz 1962). He was a politician, a Trotskyite, a revolutionary, a university lecturer at the Universidad Técnica de Oruro and the Universidad Mayor de San Andrés as well as a teacher. The first time Elsa caught sight of Fernando was when he was leading a demonstration protesting the massacre of miners in Catavi (1942). It was love at first sight and they eventually married in 1943 and later they had three daughters.

=== Women's participation ===
Elsa affirmed that effective women's participation in national and international development would only come about through social struggle and that without such participation on the part of women it would in reality be impossible to reach genuine national independence.

She belonged to two women's organizations “Alianza de Liberación de la Mujer Americana” (ALMA) and “Unión de Mujeres de Bolivia” (UMBO). She was a member of the leadership of ALMA in 1960. She was also among the founders of UMBO and delegate of UMBO to the “Seminario Mundial de la Mujer” (Women's World's Conference) that was held in Chile in 1972.

The policies of ALMA included propagating for women's emancipation and equal political rights, the defense of universal suffrage and the demand for equal pay for equal work.

UMBO is a national organization of an anti-imperialistic and anti-feudal nature through involvement in the struggle for peoples’ liberation, for their right to self determination, against foreign intervention in internal affairs, for respect for human rights, for promoting rights and opportunities for women equal to those of men in the administration and affairs of state.

=== Trade union leader ===
Testimony of Elsa's solidarity with the working class is evident from her energetic work. Her efforts to create a relationship between the teacher's trade union and the central umbrella unions for all workers in Bolivia: Central Obrera Departamental (COD) of La Paz and Central Obrera Boliviana (COB) which have been of importance to Bolivia. She was not only respected as a trade union leader but also loved by the people as one of her colleagues said. As a trade unionist leader she proposed radical measures, for example, better economic conditions for teachers, workers' power, weapons for the working class under President Juan José Torres government (1970-1971) and this posture so enthralled a colleague from Venezuela that she was given the name "Maestra de profesión y revolución".
The following are some of the posts she held as a trade union leader:

- In July 1964 she was "Secretaria de Vinculación Sindical de la Federación de Maestros urbanos de La Paz".
- In November the same year she was "Secretaria Ejecutiva de la Federación de Maestros Urbanos de Bolivia".
- In 1967 she was COD's "Secretaria de Relaciones". In this period her work consisted of reorganizing the trade unions that were outlawed under René Barrientos (1964-1969).
- In 1969 she was COBs delegate to the Seminar of Latin American Trade Unionists in Santiago. This seminar was organized by "Central Única de Trabajadores de Chile" (CUT) and Universidad de Chile. She was the only women among all the delegates from Argentina, Brazil, Colombia, Chile, Ecuador, Peru, Venezuela and Costa Rica.
- In 1970 she was COBs delegate to the first Pedagogy Congress for teachers in Bolivia.
- In 1971 she was CODs delegate at "Asamblea del Pueblo".

Since 1979 she has been named one of the "Maestros meritorios" (Meritorious' Teachers) in Bolivia.

=== Representative at the ”Asamblea del Pueblo” (Peoples’ Assembly) 1971 ===
Recognized by the workers of the trade unions as a combatant trade unionist, she was appointed as COD’S delegate to the “Asamblea del pueblo” in 1971. She was one of the five women among the two hundred and eleven delegates.

=== Exile ===
After Banzer’s military coup in Bolivia (1971), Elsa was forced into exile, first in Chile and then later in Switzerland following Pinochet’s military coup against President Salvador Allende in Chile (1973). During the long period that she was forced to live outside Bolivia, she never flagged in her outspoken condemnation of the abuses in Bolivia and other Latin American countries.

In 1975 she was invited to Turin, Italy to participate in a conference during the solidarity week together with members of the Bolivian resistance. During her visits to Stockholm, Sweden (1973-1993) she regularly met with refugees from Bolivia living in many different towns and cities. She founded branch organizations of UMBO in Gothenburg and Uppsala. During a national women’s strike in Switzerland in 1991, she was invited to talk at that event. During that day a street in Fribourg was named after her, “Elsa Cladera de Bravo Strasse”. The experiences of struggle that brought about involuntary exile are clearly important testimonies to her life (1973-2005).,

== See also ==
Bolivia, Oruro
