= Zachary Merton =

Anglo-German industrialist and philanthropist

- Born: 1843
- Died: 1915 (age 72)
- Spouse: Antonie Merton
- Relatives: Wilhelm Ralph Merton (brother)

Zachary Merton, born Zachary Moses (1843–1915), was an Anglo-German industrialist and philanthropist.

== Biography ==
Merton's family had founded Metallgesellschaft in Germany and Henry R. Merton and Co. in Britain, which were among the leading metal trading companies of their respective countries. Merton was a director and one of the largest shareholders of the British company.

Merton's wife, Antonie, had come to England from Germany with her previous husband, Hermann Schmiechen, a portrait painter. She was a follower of theosophy. Merton and Antonie lived at Folly Farm, Sulhamstead.

Merton died in 1915 but left £350,000 in his will to establish a series of convalescent homes. These included:

- the Zachary Merton Convalescent Home in Banstead, Surrey
- the Zachary Merton Convalescent Home in Bearsden, East Dunbartonshire
- the Zachary Merton Convalescent Home in Fulwood, South Yorkshire
- the Zachary Merton Convalescent Home in Grayshott, Hampshire
- the Zachary Merton Convalescent Home in Northwood, Middlesex
- the Zachary Merton Convalescent Home in Pendlebury, Greater Manchester
- the Zachary Merton Convalescent Home in Rustington, West Sussex
- the Zachary Merton Convalescent Home in Woodhouse Eaves, Leicestershire
