= Nadezhda Bravo Cladera =

Bolivian linguist, researcher and writer

- Born: Elsa Nadezhda Bravo Cladera; Oruro, Bolivia
- Education: Uppsala University
- Occupations: Linguist, researcher, writer
- Parents: Fernando Bravo James (father); Elsa Cladera Encinas (mother)

Elsa Nadezhda Bravo Cladera (Spanish pronunciation: [ˈelsa naˈðesða ˈβɾaβo klaˈðeɾa]) (Note: The Russian pronunciation of Nadezhda is [nɐˈdʲeʐdə].) is a Bolivian linguist, researcher and writer. She is a Doctor of Philosophy (Filosofie Doktor) in Romance Languages from the University of Uppsala, Sweden. She is Académica de número ("Academic of Number") of the Academia Boliviana de la Lengua.

== Early life and education ==
Nadezhda Bravo Cladera was born in Oruro, Bolivia. It was her father that named her Nadezhda which means hope in Russian and has the diminutive "Nadya". Her father Fernando Bravo James (1912–1962) was a Bolivian politician, senior lecturer at the Universidad Técnica de Oruro and at the Universidad Mayor de San Andrés (UMSA) in La Paz. Her mother Elsa Cladera de Bravo (1922–2005) was a Bolivian union leader and educator, leader of the teachers organisation in Bolivia, delegate at the Asamblea del Pueblo in 1971, engaged in the work for women's emancipation. Nadezhda has two younger sisters Emma Bolshia and María Alexandra.

She attended the Anglo American School in Oruro and when the family moved to La Paz Hugo Dávila Senior High School where she graduated as Bachelor in Humanities (1961). At the "Instituto Normal Superior Simón Bolivar" in La Paz she became a teacher of English and French languages (1966) for the Senior High School.

After Hugo Banzer's coup d'état (1971) in Bolivia she was imprisoned. Thanks to a scholarship of the French Government, she studied at the University of Franche-Comté in Besançon where she obtained her licence ès lettres de linguistique (1973).

Nadezhda met her husband, Anders Nilsson, at the university of Besançon. "It was love that took her to Sweden". They have two sons: Andrés Fernando and Ernesto Ricardo. In Sweden, she obtained a Bachelor of Arts degree (Filosofie kandidatexamen) (1983) and a Master of Arts degree (Filosofie Magisterexamen) (1997), with a major in Spanish, at the Stockholm University and her Doctor of Philosophy degree (Filosofie Doktorsexamen) in Romance Languages with a major in Hispanic Linguistics (2004) at the University of Uppsala. "She defended her thesis in Spanish with French guidance".

== Work and research ==
Bravo Cladera's main areas of research are dialogue studies, spontaneous conversations and discourse markers. She has directed the linguistic projects entitled "Spanish of Bilingual Youth of Stockholm" (Español de Jóvenes Bilingües de Estocolmo- EJBE (2005–2016)). Now she directs the projects: "Spanish of Youth of the City of El Alto" (Castellano de Jóvenes de la Ciudad de El ALTO -CASJOCIAL (2017–)) and "Spanish of Children and Youth of the City of La Paz" (Castellano de Niños y Jóvenes de la Ciudad de La Paz- CASNIJOLP ([1999] 2022-)). She is currently a founder member of the project Dialogue Studies at the "Asociación de Lingüística y Filología de América Latina" (ALFAL), Delegate of ALFAL for Belgium, England, Finland, the Netherlands, Iceland, Norway and Sweden (Region Nordwest Europa), a supervisor (ad-honorem) at the Universidad Mayor de San Andrés (Higher University of San Andrés) in La Paz, Bolivia.

In Bolivia, her pedagogical experience, has to do with young people who had Aimara language or Quechua language as their mother tongue and had learned Spanish at school. She taught them modern languages as English and French. This experience contributed to her interest in problems concerning bilingualism. Later in Sweden, the experience with her sons, who grew up with two languages at home (Swedish and Spanish) increased her interest in research on bilingualism, languages and cultures in contact. For example, the corpus of her doctoral thesis is based on spontaneous conversations of bilingual youth (Spanish, Swedish) in Stockholm.

Bravo Cladera has been senior lecturer in Hispanic linguistics at Linköping University and Gävle University College and lecturer in Hispanic linguistics at the University of Uppsala (1996–2007), where she has supervised more than 40 essays on language themes and even some in literature and economics. At the Stockholm Institute of Education (Lärarhögskolan i Stockholm) and at Högskolan i Eskilstuna Västerås (actually Mälardalen University College) she has been lecturer in Early bilingualism and Children's literatur (1987–1995). She has also taught Spanish as modern language and as mother tongue at Huddinge Senior High School (Huddinge Gymnasiet) and Ingemundskola at Karolinska Institutet (1977–1999). At Huddinge Senior High School she was responsible editor of the school newspaper in Spanish "Periódico Latino". In Bolivia she taught English and French in Senior High Schools (1967–1971) and was lecturer in General Linguistics at the "Instituto Nacional de Estudios Lingûísticos" (INEL)(1971).

She is the author of several monographs and articles on discourse markers, dialogue studies, bilingualism, languages in contact as well as other linguistic and pedagogical themes. She has been publishing manuals for her teaching in Spanish Phonetics, Linguistics and Pragmatics. In 2013 she publishes a biography about Elsa Cladera de Bravo, The purpose of this biography was make known a part of Bolivian history that is worth remembering.

== Awards and honors ==
In the 21 October 2022, Elsa Nadezhda Bravo Cladera became Académica de número (Academic of number) of Academia Boliviana de la Lengua with the discourse: "Castellano de niños y jóvenes de Bolivia: escritura y oralidad". Hugo César Boero Kavlin was in charge of the response.

In 2017, Bravo Cladera was declared Miembro correspondiente (Academic correspondent) of the Academia Boliviana de la Lengua (Bolivian Academy) as a recognition for her linguistic knowledge and literary merits, by his Director José G. Mendoza and by the Plenary meeting of the Bolivian Academy.

In 2009, Bravo Cladera was declared Honorary Member of the "Instituto Boliviano de Lexicografía y otros Estudios Lingüísticos" (IBLEL) as a recognition of her valuable contribution in the field of linguistic research, by his Director Carlos Coello Vila.

== Selected writings ==
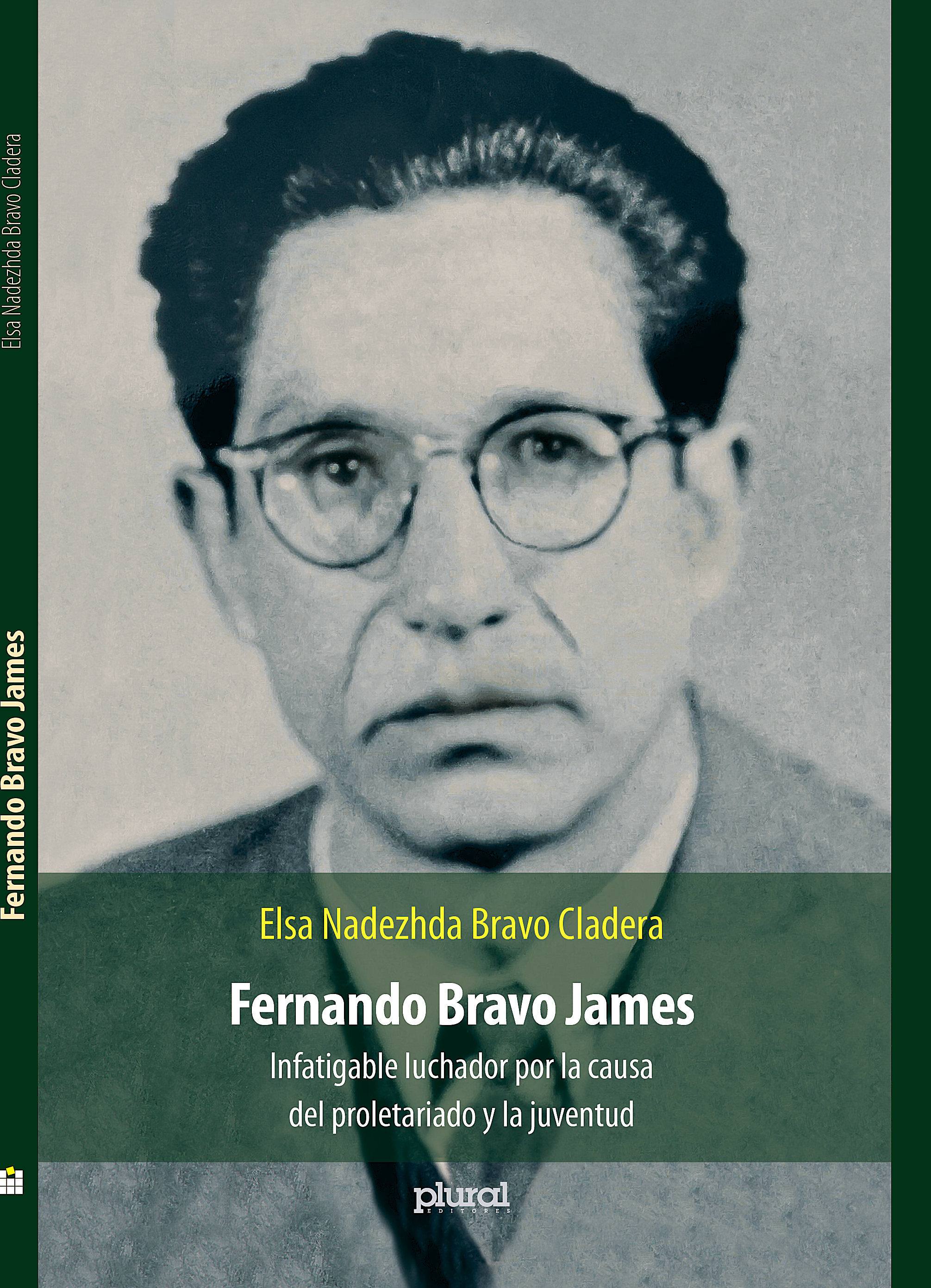
Cover of book about Fernando Bravo James

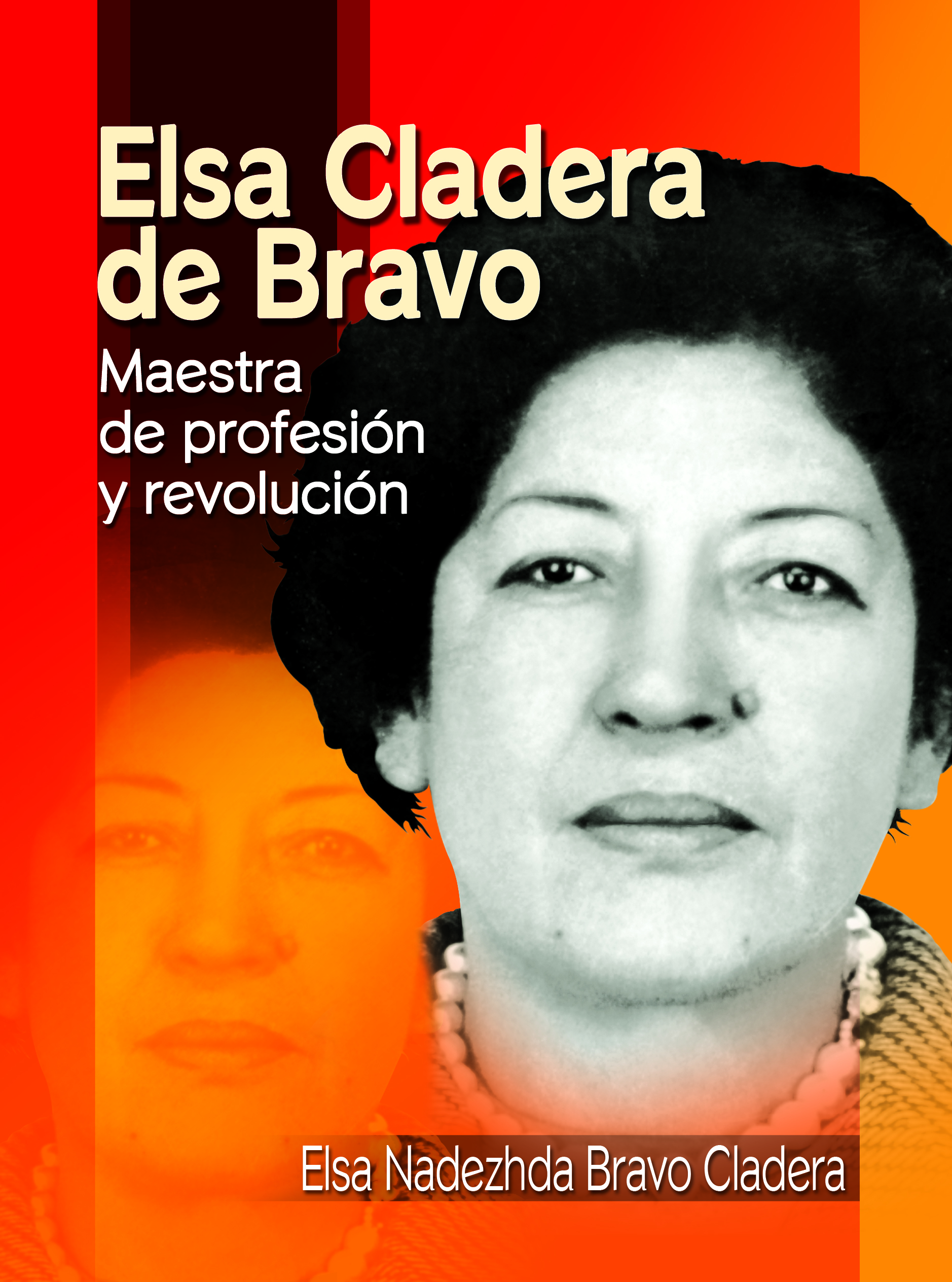
Cover of book about Elsa Cladera de Bravo

- Fernando Bravo James. Infatigable luchador por la causa del proletariado y la juventud (La Paz: Plural editores 2024)
- Una revisión de los rasgos fonéticos y fonológicos del español de Bolivia ([2023]
- Castellano de niños y jóvenes de Bolivia: escritura y oralidad ([2022c] 21 de octubre de 2022. Discurso de ingreso a la Academia Boliviana de la lengua
- La circulación interactiva en el diálogo en castellano de jóvenes de la ciudad de el Alto ([2022a]Cuadernos de la ALFAL No. 14 (1), pp. 145-171. May 2022).
- En torno a los marcadores del discurso (90 años de la Academia Boliviana de la Lengua, pp. 207–231, 2017b).
- Análisis del discurso, diálogo y marcadores discursivos. En ″Actas del XVIII Congreso Internacional de la Asociación de Lingüística y Filología de la América Latina, 2017a (S 116, pp. 1–18)″. Colombia: Universidad Nacional de Colombia.
- ¿Puedo aprovechar? Interacciones en el transporte diario de la ciudad de La Paz (Lexi-Lexe, Nr 8, IBLEL, 2016).
- Construcciones colaborativas en los diálogos de jóvenes hispanohablantes en Estocolmo (João Pessoa: E book-ALFAL 50 ANOS, pp. 814–846, 2015).
- Elsa Cladera de Bravo. Maestra de profesión y revolución (La Paz: Correveidile, 2013)
- Diálogos. su desarrollo en diferentes grupos de jóvenes hispanohablantes (Actas del XVI Congreso de la ALFAL: Alcalá de Henares, pp. 4121–4131, 2011).
- Diálogos espontáneos: incidencia de los marcadores del discurso (Academia Boliviana de la Lengua, correspondiente de la Real Española, Anuario 25, La paz: Editorial Greco, pp. 47–67, 2011a)
- Backchannels as a realization of interaction: Some uses of mm and mhm in Spanish (In Dialog in Spanish, Amsterdam: John Benjamins Publishing Company, pp. 137–156, 2010).
- Y, pero, así que y es que. Un estudio de su uso en las interacciones del español de jóvenes bilingües y unilingües (Uppsala: Uppsala University, 2005). ISBN 91-554-6264-2
- Un estudio de los marcadores del discurso y su distribución en interacciones diádicas de jóvenes bilingües (Actas del XXIII Congreso Internacional de Lingüística y Filología Románica, Salamanca, 24-30 septiembre 2001. Publicación: Tübinge, Max Niemeyer Verlag, Vol II, pp. 133–146, 2003a).
- Study of Discourse Markers and their Distribution in Dyadic Interactions of Bilingual Youth (ERIC Cleringhouse on Languages and Linguistics [database online] 2003b).
- Contrastes y similitudes en el uso de los marcadores del discurso en interacciones de jóvenes bilingües y unilingües (XV Skandinaviska Romanistkongress, Oslo 12–13 August 2002).
- Bilingüismo y educación. Experiencias comparadas (Signo. Cuadernos bolivianos de cultura, 54, pp. 105–111, 2000).
- Conectores semánticos y pragmáticos (Moderna språk, 2, pp. 218–228, 1997).
- Responsible editor of Periódico Latino (Huddinge: Huddinge Senior high School. 8 numbers has been published between 1984 and 1991).
