= Folly Farm, Sulhamstead =

Farmhouse in Sulhamstead, Berkshire, England

Coordinates: 51°24′57″N 1°05′39″W

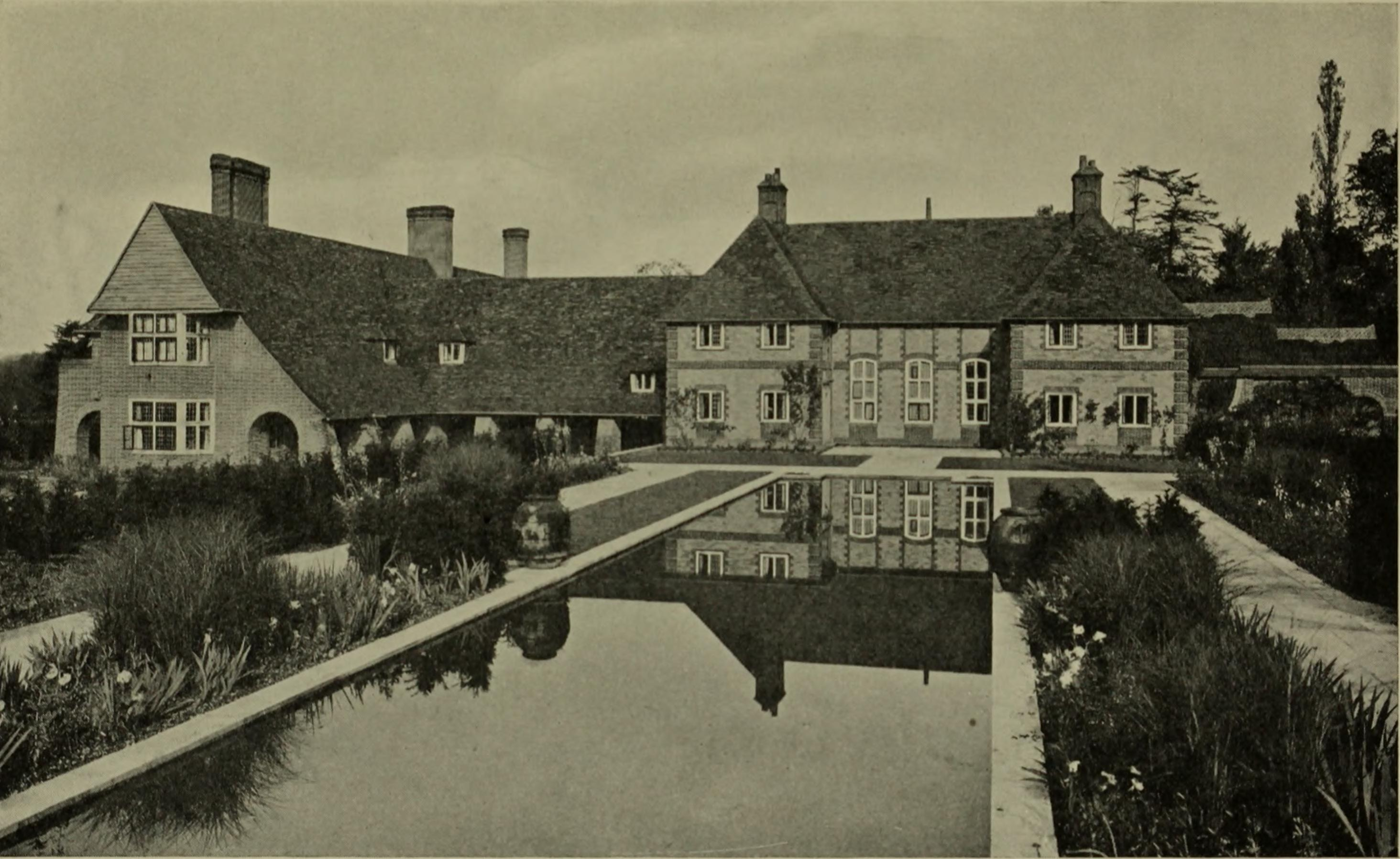
1921 view of the south, garden front, showing the vernacular wing of 1912 (left), the William and Mary front of 1906 and the canal garden

Folly Farm is an Arts and Crafts style country house in Sulhamstead, West Berkshire, England. Built around a small farmhouse dating to c. 1650, the house was substantially extended in William and Mary style by architect Edwin Lutyens c. 1906, and further extended by him in vernacular style c. 1912. It is a Grade I listed building. The gardens, designed by Lutyens and Gertrude Jekyll, are Grade II* listed in the National Register of Historic Parks and Gardens. They are among the best-known gardens of the Lutyens/Jekyll partnership.

== House ==
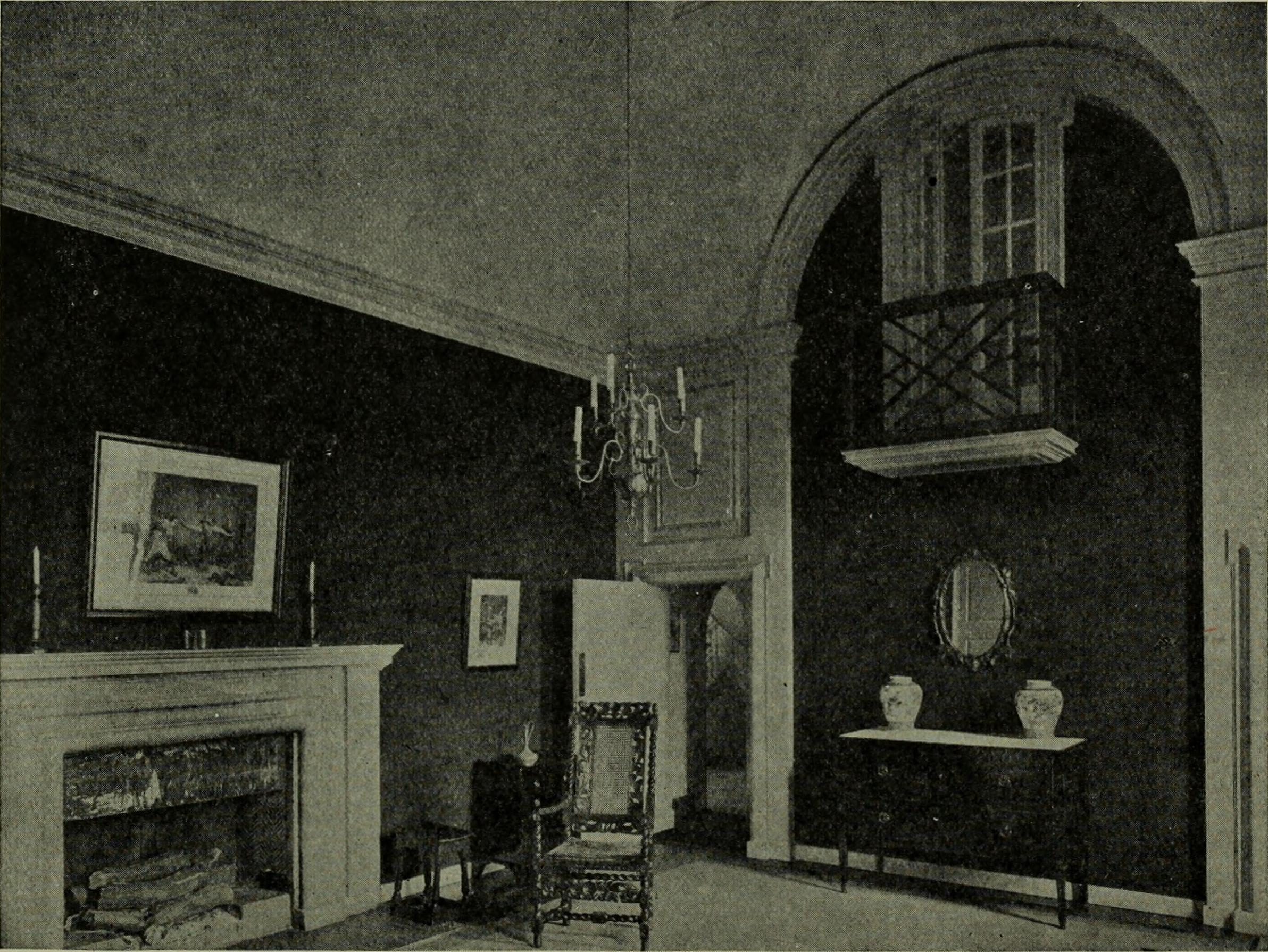
The neoclassical hall, 1921

Around 1906, Lutyens extended the 17th-century, timbered cottage for H. H. Cochrane, using grey brick dressed with red brick and ashlar, in William and Mary style. The addition is H-shaped. The interior of the H's centre, which aligns east–west, is occupied by a two-storey, neoclassical style hall, which Lutyens painted black. The original cottage, which Lutyens connected to the northwest corner of the new house, became a service wing.

Around 1912, Lutyens created the vernacular addition for new owners of the house, Zachary Merton and his wife Antonie, who had both divorced from their former spouses to marry each other. Zachary Merton (born Zachary Moses) was a businessman and philanthropist. His family had founded Metallgesellschaft in Germany and Henry R. Merton and Co. in Britain, which were among the leading metal trading companies of their respective countries. Merton was a director and one of the largest shareholders of the British company. Antonie had come to England from Germany with her previous husband, Hermann Schmiechen, a portrait painter. She was a follower of theosophy, like Lutyens's wife Emily.

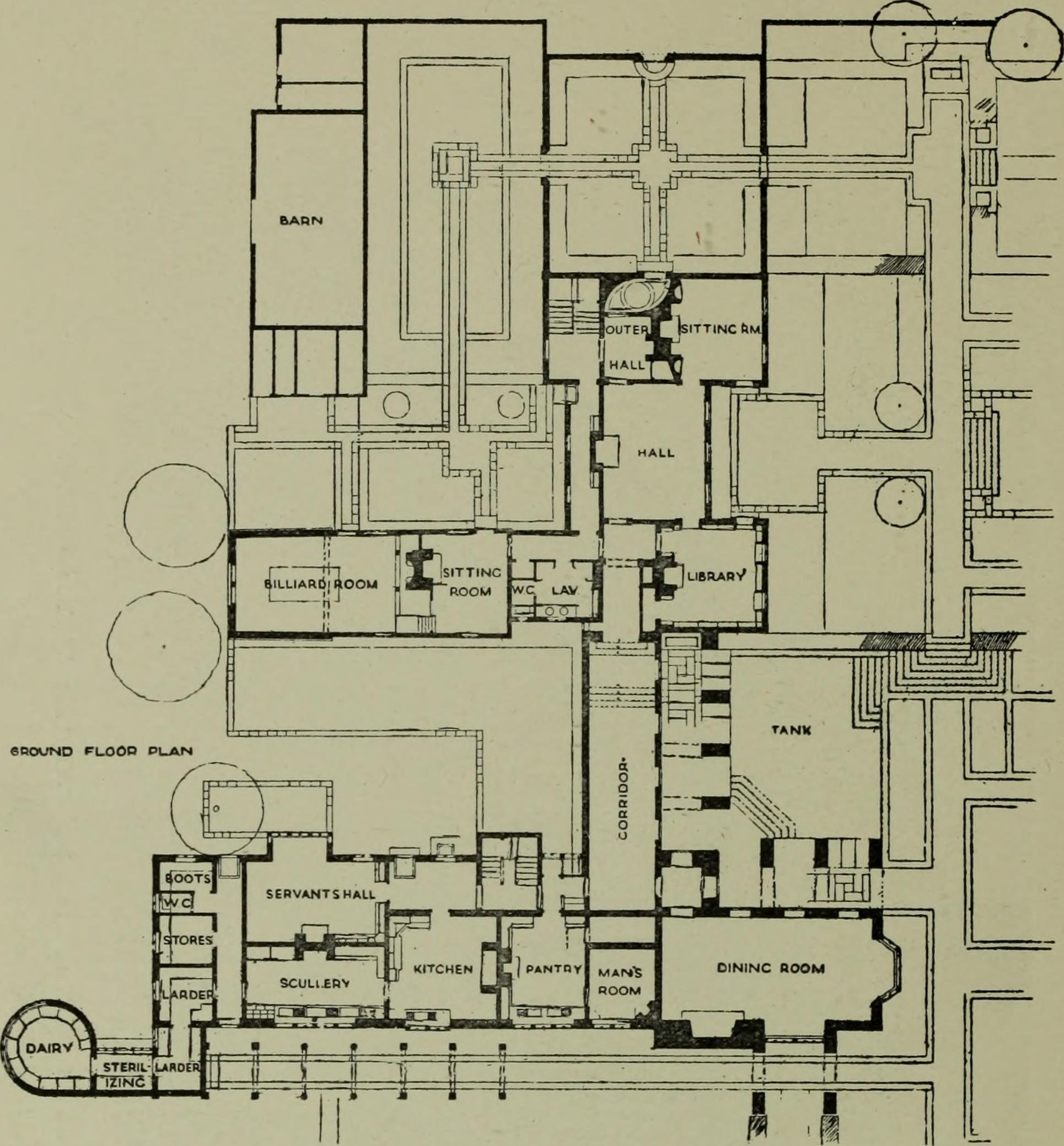
House ground floor plan, 1921 (South front is to the right)

Lutyens built the vernacular addition in red brick, with tile-hanging and weatherboarding. He extended the line of the centre of the existing H with a two-storey connecting wing, containing on each floor a corridor 50 feet (15 m) long and 15 feet (4.6 m) wide, leading to a much larger, new west wing, aligned north–south. The west wing's south end features a large bay window on each floor. At ground level, the south end contains a neoclassical dining room with a huge fireplace, as high as the room. Above the dining room, the main bedroom has a sleeping balcony (for outside sleeping), built over arches, on its west side. On the east side, there is an L-shaped cloister with buttressed arches running alongside the dining room and along the south side of the connecting corridor, bordering two sides of the Tank Court and its rectangular pool.

The service quarters moved to the new wing, with a circular dairy attached to its northern end. The original cottage became a billiard room.

Zachary Merton died in 1915. Antonie Merton allowed Lutyens and his family to spend the summer of 1916 at Folly Farm, where they entertained Jekyll, the playwright Edward Knoblock and the painters William Nicholson and his wife Mabel Pryde. Nicholson painted a mural in the dining room during his stay.

During World War II, the house served as a maternity hospital, then reverted to private ownership. The British celebrity cook Keith Floyd (1943 - 2009) was born at Folly Farm on 28 December 1943.

== Gardens ==
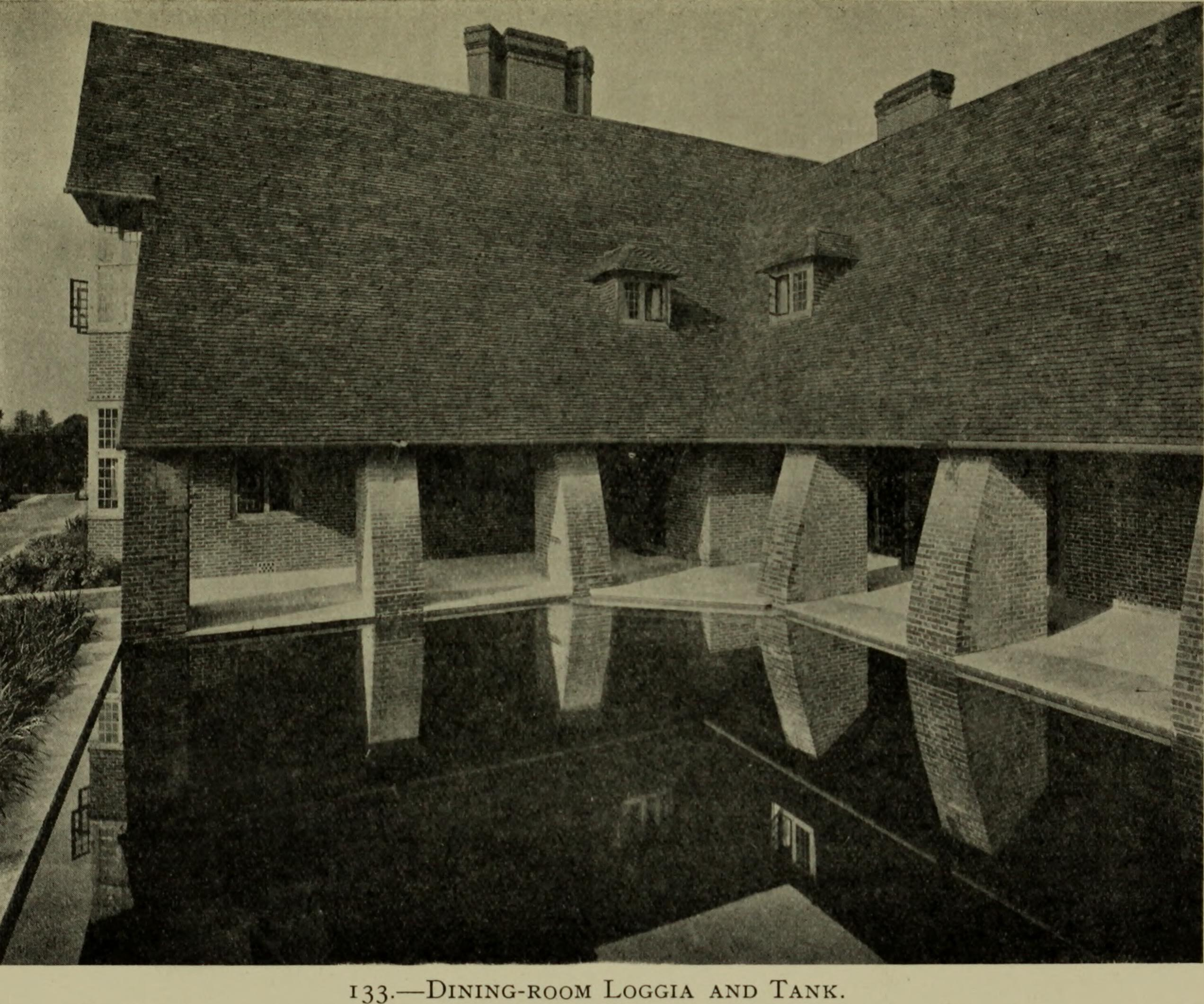
Cloister and Tank Court, 1921

The formal gardens extend to the south and west of the house, with lawns beyond.

In 1906, Lutyens and Jekyll turned the area around the original cottage and its barn into a series of walled courts. To the south of the house, they created a walled kitchen garden and a rhododendron walk. The latter, running south along the eastern side of the gardens, has subsequently been replaced by a lime walk leading to a White Garden.

In 1912 they placed a canal garden, with a long rectangular pool, to the south of the earlier William and Mary addition. Between the new west wing and the kitchen garden, they positioned a parterre garden, and to the west of that, a sunken rose garden. Tank Court, with its cloister and pool, has been called "probably Lutyens's pièce de résistance in garden architecture".

The 18th-century thatched barn, the kitchen garden and some Lutyen-designed cottages of c. 1912 are all Grade II listed.
