= Moritz Hochschild =

Bolivian businessman (1881–1965)

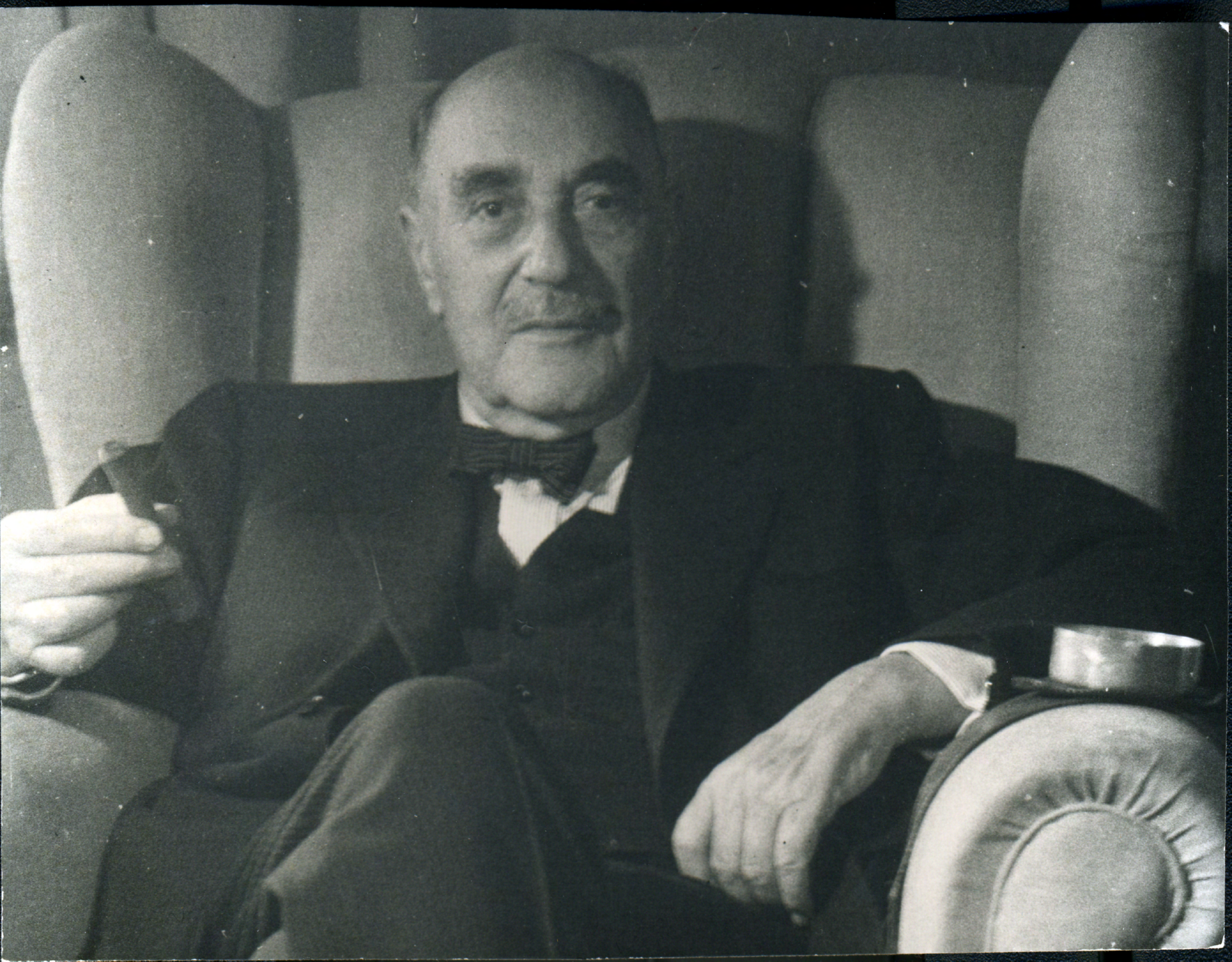
- Portrait by Irene Brann; Lima, Peru c.1962
- Born: Moritz Hochschild; February 17, 1881; Biblis, Germany
- Died: June 12, 1965 (aged 84); Paris, France
- Burial place: Père Lachaise Cemetery, Paris
- Citizenship: German
- Occupation: Mining executive
- Spouse: Käthe Rosenbaum
- Children: Gerardo Hochschild Rosenbaum

Moritz (Mauricio) Hochschild (February 17, 1881 – June 12, 1965) was a leading mining industry businessman in the first half of the twentieth century. Along with Simón Iturri Patiño and Carlos Víctor Aramayo, he was one of the three so-called Bolivian tin barons. Additionally, he saved thousands of Jews during the Holocaust by facilitating their legal admission to Bolivia.

== Early life ==
Hochschild was born in Biblis, Germany, into a Jewish family which had already been active in the mining industry for over a generation. He was the eldest son of a general trader, Louis Hochschild Altschul (1853–1923) who had two cousins involved in the metal industry: brothers Berthold Hochschild, who founded the American Metal Company and Zachary Hochschild, a partner in Metallgesellschaft. After Hochschild graduated from school, he studied mining and engineering at the Freiberg University of Mining and Technology. He was agnostic.

== Career ==
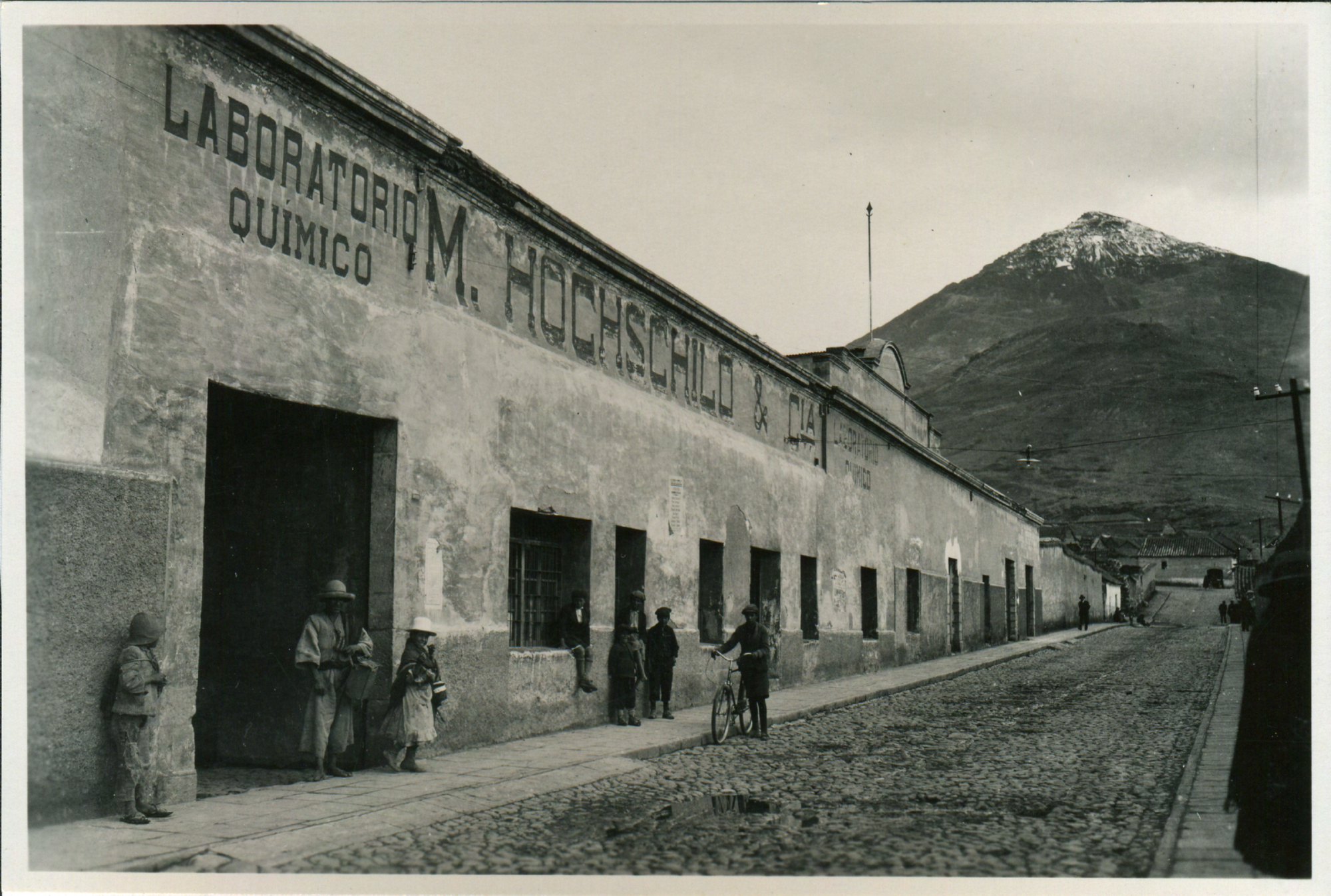
Mining facility of M. Hochschild & Co. in Potosi, Bolivia, c.1932

In 1905, he began his career in the field at the large industrial conglomerate Metallgesellschaft. He then was the company's agent in Spain and Australia. Later, he moved to South America to work independently. After several years in Chile where he worked with his brother Sali Hochschild, he returned to Germany and stayed there until the end of the first World War.

In 1918, he married Käthe Rosenbaum and in 1920, he returned to South America but to Bolivia. In 1920, his son, Gerardo Hochschild Rosenbaum, was born; his wife died in 1924. Known as 'Don Mauricio' in South America, Hochschild built up an economic empire in Bolivia during the following two decades around the mining and trade of tin ore. His empire stretched from Peru to Chile. During this period of growth, more of his family followed him to South America to work for him, including his cousin Philipp Hochschild and Philipp's wife Germaine. Moritz and Germaine had an affair, and they married after Germaine divorced Philipp.

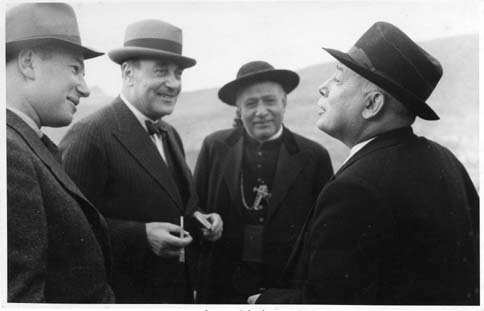
Hochschild (center) with the bishop and the mayor of Potosi, 1940

The 1930s saw the peak of the Moritz Hochschild Group's economical and political influence. In 1938, using his influence with German Busch, Bolivia's military president from 1937 to 1939, Hochschild pushed Bolivia to open its doors to Jewish refugees from Hitler's Germany. An estimated 9,000 were admitted. Hochschild also funded the transport of the refugees and their housing once they arrived in the South American country. Although his involvement was not widely publicised at the time, later analysis of involvement led to 21st century mass media outlets calling him "Bolivia's Schindler."

In both 1939 and 1944, Hochschild was arrested by the Bolivian government and sentenced to death. Just two weeks after his release following his 1944 arrest, he was captured and held by kidnappers for two weeks. After he was freed he left Bolivia, never to return.

In 1951, the Hochschilds donated the majority of their fortune to the Hochschild Trust and Foundation. In the following year, the Moritz Hochschild Group was nationalized during the Bolivian National Revolution; however, they were compensated with an allotment of 30% of the company's prior assets. The company, Hochschild Mining, grew further and expanded worldwide. In 1961 Hochschild inaugurated Mantos Blancos copper mine in Antofagasta, Chile, which became his most successful mining operation, although its best results were to come after his death.

== Holocaust savior ==
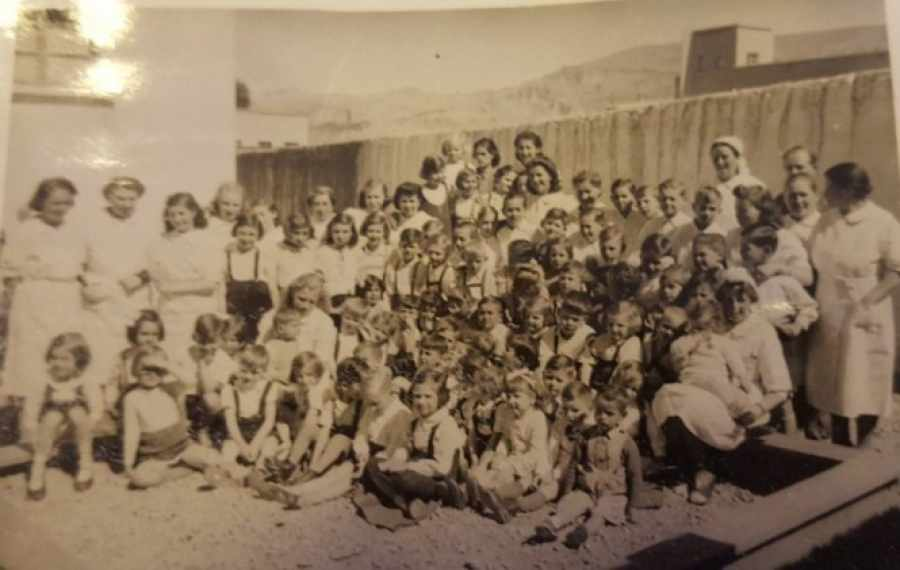
Jewish children at a kindergarten in Bolivia funded by Hochschild, c.1944

Hochschild has been called the "Bolivian Schindler," after it was discovered that the Bolivian business tycoon facilitated the escape of between 9,000 and 22,000 Jews from Nazi Germany and occupied Europe.

== Final years ==
Moritz Hochschild died in 1965 in Paris, and was buried in Père Lachaise Cemetery. He is the great-uncle of billionaire Eduardo Hochschild, who is now the chairman of Hochschild Mining PLC.
