= Sali Hochschild =

German-Chilean businessman

- Born: June 18, 1883
- Died: January 1965 (aged 81)
- Education: Columbia University
- Occupation: Mining executive
- Known for: Founder of Compania Minera y Comercial Sali Hochschild S.A.
- Spouse: Ana Kaufmann
- Children: 4
- Parent(s): Jeanette Hirsch Hochschild; Ludwig Louis Hochschild
- Family: Moritz Hochschild (brother); Hernán Hochschild (grandson); Eduardo Hochschild (great-nephew)

Sali Hochschild (June 18, 1883 – January 1965) was a German-born Chilean businessman, the founder of Compania Minera y Comercial Sali Hochschild S.A., once one of the largest mining and mineral processing companies in Chile.

== Biography ==
Hochschild was born to a Jewish family in Germany, the son of Jeanette (née Hirsch) and Ludwig Louis Hochschild. His mother died during his childbirth. His father was a general trader who had two cousins involved in the metal industry: brothers Berthold Hochschild, who founded the American Metal Company and Zachary Hochschild, a partner in Metallgesellschaft. He had two brothers, Moritz Hochschild (1881–1965) and Heinrich Hochschild (1882–1986). The brothers were all educated in Germany as mining engineers. He later attended Columbia University in New York City. In 1911, he and his brother arrived in Chile where they operated a small ore dealing business. After World War I, which created strong demand for metals, the brothers, having both amassed sufficient wealth to branch out on their own, dissolved their relationship and divided their territory with Sali taking central and southern Chile and Moritz taking northern Chile, Peru, and Bolivia.

In 1920, Sali obtained Chilean citizenship and formed Compania Minera y Comercial Sali Hochschild S.A. In 1924, he opened the Pataguas mine near La Ligua where he installed the country's first flotation plant which enabled the recovery of valuable metals from much lower grade ore. Flush with cash from his first independent venture, he purchased several medium-sized mines in the Provincia de Aconcagua at es:El Molle, El Palqui, and La Cebada (Chile). In 1936, he completed the Ojancos flotation plant in Copiapó which separated gold from copper ore. Finding that many copper ores could not be separated by flotation, he adapted new technologies to separate the gold used the cyanide process which utilized cyanide, sulfuric acid, and lime to leach gold from the ore. He built a sulfuric acid factory nearby so the operation would be self-sufficient. Ojancos was the first plant in South America to use this new and highly toxic technology processing 300 tons of ore per day. In 1943, he built a separation plant at Chanaral dedicated to separate copper from tailings coming from the many mines at Potrerillos that were being dumped into the Rio Salado. In 1948, he founded Compania Minera Delerio S.A. which operated separation plants in Punitaqui and Ovalle; and he built additional plants in Antofagasta. Between 1951 and 1959, he purchased 36,000 hectares of land at Michilla (100 km north of Antofagasta) and formed Compania Minera Carolina de Michilla S.A. which became one of the largest mines in Chile (sold to Antofagasta plc in 1983).

== Personal life ==
Hochschild was married to Ana Kaufmann; they had four children: Walter Ludwig Hochschild Kaufmann; Dorothy Höchschild Kaufmann; Laura Höchschild Kaufmann and Gabriela Höchschild Kaufmann. He died in January 1965.
