= Eduardo Hochschild =

Peruvian businessman (born 1963)

Eduardo Hochschild Beeck
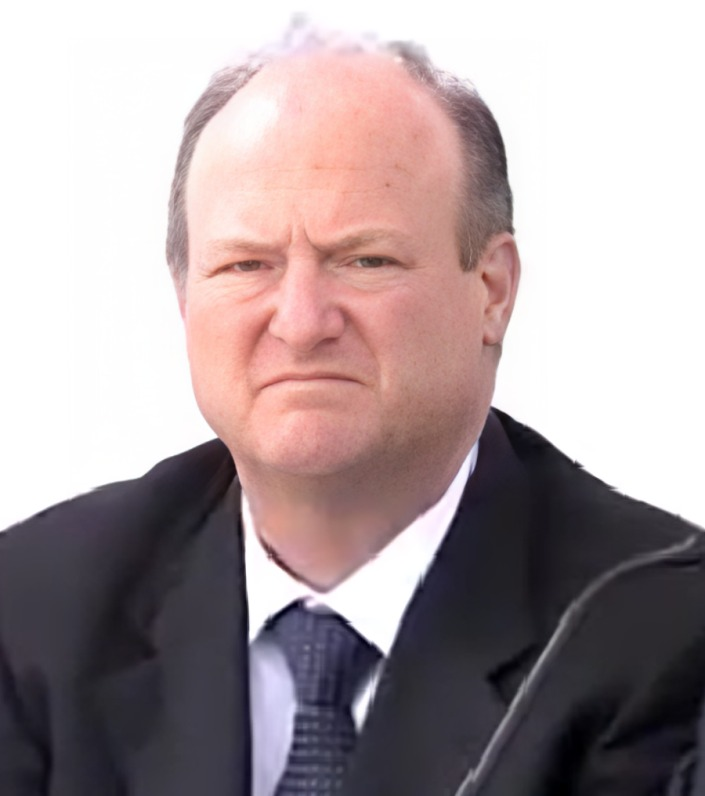
- Hochschild in 2013
- Born: December 4, 1964 (age 61); Lima, Peru
- Education: Tufts University
- Occupation: Businessman
- Known for: Chairman of Hochschild Mining; Chairman of Cementos Pacasmayo
- Children: 4
- Parent(s): Luis Hochschild Plaut; Ana Beeck Navarro

Eduardo Hochschild (Lima, December 4, 1964) is a Peruvian businessman. He is the chairman of Hochschild Mining and Cementos Pacasmayo.

== Biography ==
Hochschild is the son of Ana Beeck Navarro and Luis Hochschild Plaut. His father founded Cementos Pacasmayo; co-founded the Tecnologia Superior University (TECSUP) with his brother-in-law, Rodolfo Beeck Navarro; and is a cousin of Hernán Hochschild, president of Sociedad Nacional de Minería. His great-uncle, Moritz Hochschild, founded Hochschild Mining; and his great-uncle, Sali Hochschild, founded Compania Minera y Comercial Sali Hochschild S.A. In 1987, he graduated from the Tufts University School of Engineering with a degree in Engineering Physics. He then went to work for the family business as a mine safety assistant. In 1998, his father was killed in a kidnapping attempt and Eduardo assumed leadership of both companies.

== Personal life ==
He is married to attorney Mariana Correa Sabogal, daughter of Gustavo Correa Miller and Dolores Sabogal Morzán; and the niece of former Peruvian first lady Violeta Correa and former Foreign Minister of Peru, Javier Correa Elías. They have 4 children: Alexia, Theodora, Kraft Michelle. In May 2022, Nicolas Hochschild was appointed Non-Executive Director of the board of Hochschild Mining

As of July 2026, per Forbes magazine, he has a net worth of US$4.5B.
