= Hochschild Mining =

Silver and gold mining company

- Type: Public
- Traded as: LSE: HOC; FTSE 250
- Industry: Mining
- Founded: 1911
- Headquarters: London, UK
- Key people: Eduardo Hochschild, Chairman; Ignacio Bustamante, CEO
- Revenue: ▲$1208.6 million (2025)
- Operating income: ▼$365.3 million (2025)
- Net income: ▲$247.4 million (2025)
- Subsidiaries: Aclara Resources, Compania Minera Ares, Minera Santa Cruz, International Minerals, Andina Minerals, Compania Minera Arcata
- Website: www.hochschildmining.com

Hochschild Mining plc is a leading British-based silver and gold mining business operating in North, Central, and South America. It is headquartered in Lima, Peru, with a corporate office in London, is listed on the London Stock Exchange and is a constituent of the FTSE 250 Index. The main shareholder is the Peruvian businessman Eduardo Hochschild. The company is focused on the underground mining of narrow veins.

== History ==
The company was founded in 1911 by Moritz "Mauricio" Hochschild, one of South America's three tin barons. He had mining operations in several countries, primarily in Bolivia and Chile.

The company was first listed on the London Stock Exchange in 2006. It started operations at the San José mine in Argentina in June 2007, at the Moris mine in Mexico in August 2007, and at the Pallancata mine in southern Peru in September 2007.

In 2012 local people in Chumbivilcas complained about the Ares mine and the government of Peru decided to suspend operations in Ares on a temporary basis so it could carry out an environmental audit.

== Operations ==
The company has mines in the following locations:

- Peru – Pallancata and Inmaculada mines
- Argentina – San José mine

Hochschild Mining owns 55.9% of Aclara Resources which seeks to mine rare-earth elements in Penco, Chile and in Brazil. Aclara Resources is as of 2026 building a rare-earth separator plant in Louisiana in the United States to be supplied with the output from its future mines in Brazil and Chile.
