= Berthold Hochschild =

German American mining magnate (1860–1928)

- Born: March 6, 1860; Biblis, Grand Duchy of Hesse
- Died: January 24, 1928 (aged 67)
- Occupation: Businessman
- Known for: Founder of the American Metal Company
- Children: Harold K. Hochschild; Walter Hochschild; Gertrude Hochschild Sergievsky
- Family: Adam Hochschild (grandson); Patricia Hochschild Labalme (granddaughter); Zachary Hochschild (brother)

Berthold Hochschild (March 6, 1860 – January 24, 1928) was a mining magnate, a founder of the American Metal Company, and a philanthropist.

== Biography ==
Hochschild was born to a Jewish family in Biblis, Grand Duchy of Hesse, the son of Auguste Gustina (née Bendheim) and Koppel Jakob Hochschild. In 1881, his brother Zachary Hochschild, along with his cousin Wilhelm Ralph Merton and Leo Ellinger, founded Metallgesellschaft AG. In 1886, he immigrated to the United States, founding American Metal with Jacob Longeloth two years later. He had two sons, Harold K. Hochschild and Walter Hochschild, and a daughter, Gertrude Hochschild (married to Russian World War I ace and Sikorsky Aircraft test pilot Boris Sergievsky). Harold founded the Adirondack Museum in Blue Mountain Lake, New York and Walter Hochschild built an Adirondack Great Camp on Eagle Lake in 1938.

The sons of his cousin, Louis Hochschild Altschul (1853–1923), were Bolivian tin baron Mauricio Hochschild and Chilean mining magnate Sali Hochschild.
