= Zachary Merton Hospital =

- Sussex Community NHS Foundation Trust
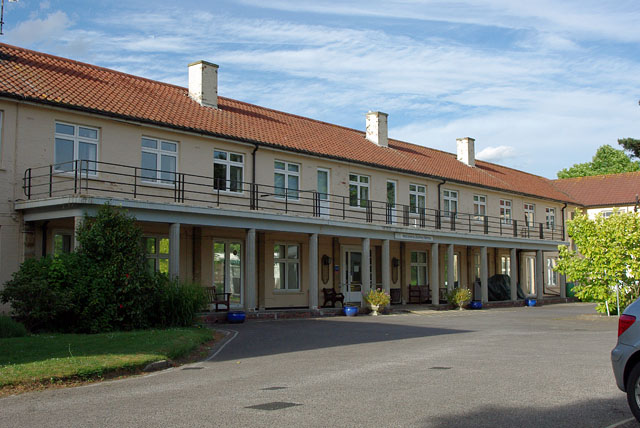
- Zachary Merton Hospital

- Shown in West Sussex

Geography
- Location: Rustington, West Sussex, England
- Coordinates: 50.8079°N 0.5007°W

Organisation
- Care system: National Health Service
- Type: Community

History
- Founded: 1937
- Closed: 2023

Links
- Website: www.sussexcommunity.nhs.uk/services/locations/zachary-merton-hospital.htm

Zachary Merton Hospital was a health facility at Glenville Road, Rustington, West Sussex, England. It was managed by the Sussex Community NHS Foundation Trust.

== History ==
The facility, which was financed by a trust fund established by Zachary Merton, was opened as a convalescent home in April 1937. It became a maternity hospital in 1939 and, after joining the National Health Service as the Zachary Merton Maternity Home in 1948, it became a community hospital in 1979. The hospital was closed, initially on a temporary basis, in November 2023: its permanent closure was confirmed in July 2025.
