= Aron Hirsch =

- Born: Aron Hirsch; 6 February 1858; Halberstadt, Kingdom of Prussia
- Died: 22 February 1942 (aged 84); Wiesbaden, Germany
- Occupation: Industrialist

Aron Hirsch (6 February 1858 – 22 February 1942) was a German metal trader.

== Biography ==
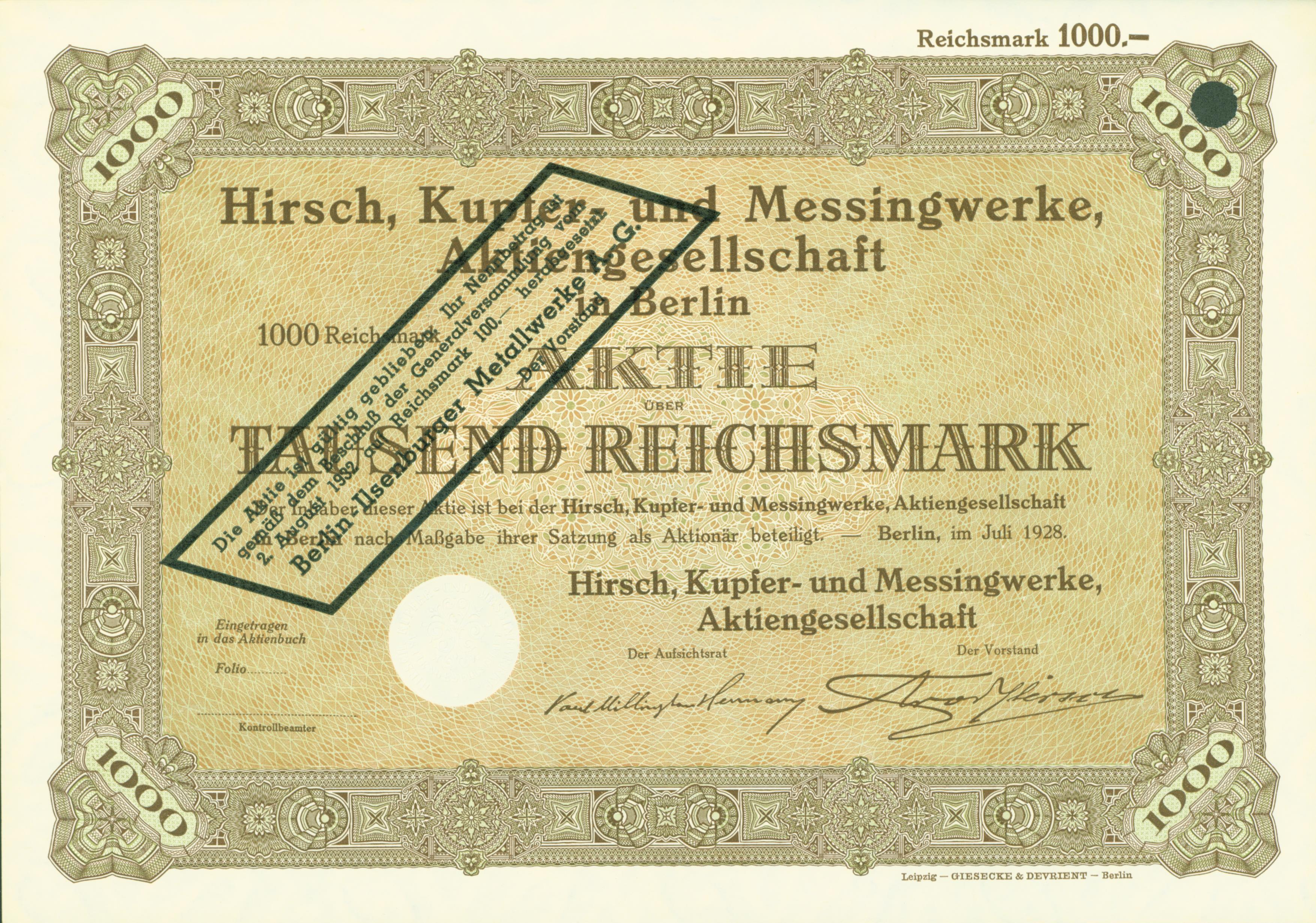
Share of the Hirsch, Kupfer- und Messingwerke AG, issued July 1928, signed by Aron Hirsch

Hirsch was born to a Jewish family on 6 February 1858 in Halberstadt, Germany. In 1877, he joined the family business, metal trading company Aron Hirsch & Sohn, founded by the grandfather Aron Hirsch (1783–1842), in Halberstadt. In 1898, he moved to Berlin to take over the management of the Eberswalder Messingwerk after the death of his uncle Gustav Hirsch. In 1906 he joined the de:Gesellschaft der Freunde (Society of Friends). In 1907, Aron Hirsch & Sohn discontinued its industrial activities and incorporated them into the newly founded company Hirsch Kupfer- und Messingwerke AG (HKM), Berlin, which went public in 1909 where he served as chairman of the board and shareholder.

During the World War I, HKM profited due to German armaments orders but simultaneously lost money as their overseas raw material base was expropriated by Germany's war opponents. In the 1920s, Aron Hirsch & Sohn developed into a major European enterprise with holdings in around 50 companies in Germany and abroad. The headquarters were moved from Halberstadt to Berlin in 1927. With the global economic crisis starting in 1929, the company ran into economic difficulties. This led to the dissolution of the company in the early 1930s. In 1929, the Imperial Chemical Industries (ICI) took over the firm's industrial activities and the trading house was subsumed by Handelshaus H. Schoyer.

Aron Hirsch became a member of the management board of the Berlin Stock Exchange and served on numerous supervisory boards, including Deutsche Bank.

Hirsch was involved in the Hochschule für die Wissenschaft des Judentums (the Academy for the Science of Judaism) and in the Berlin Jewish community. In 1922 he received an honorary doctorate from the Technische Universität Darmstadt. He was married to Amalie "Mally" Hirsch (b. Mainz d. 1865 in Frankfurt); they had two children: Siegmund Hirsch (1885–1981) and Dora "Dodo" Hirsch Schwartz (d. 1893). In 1932, Hirsch retired to Wiesbaden with his wife and initially lived in the Hotel Nassauer Hof. Due to the increasing persecution after the rise of the National Socialists and their seizure of power in 1933, the couple was forced to continuously relocate. Aron Hirsch died on 22 February 1942, in Wiesbaden; his wife Amalie committed suicide on 27 August 1942, shortly after it was announced that she would be deported to the Theresienstadt concentration camp.
