= Wilhelm Ralph Merton =

German businessman (1848–1916)

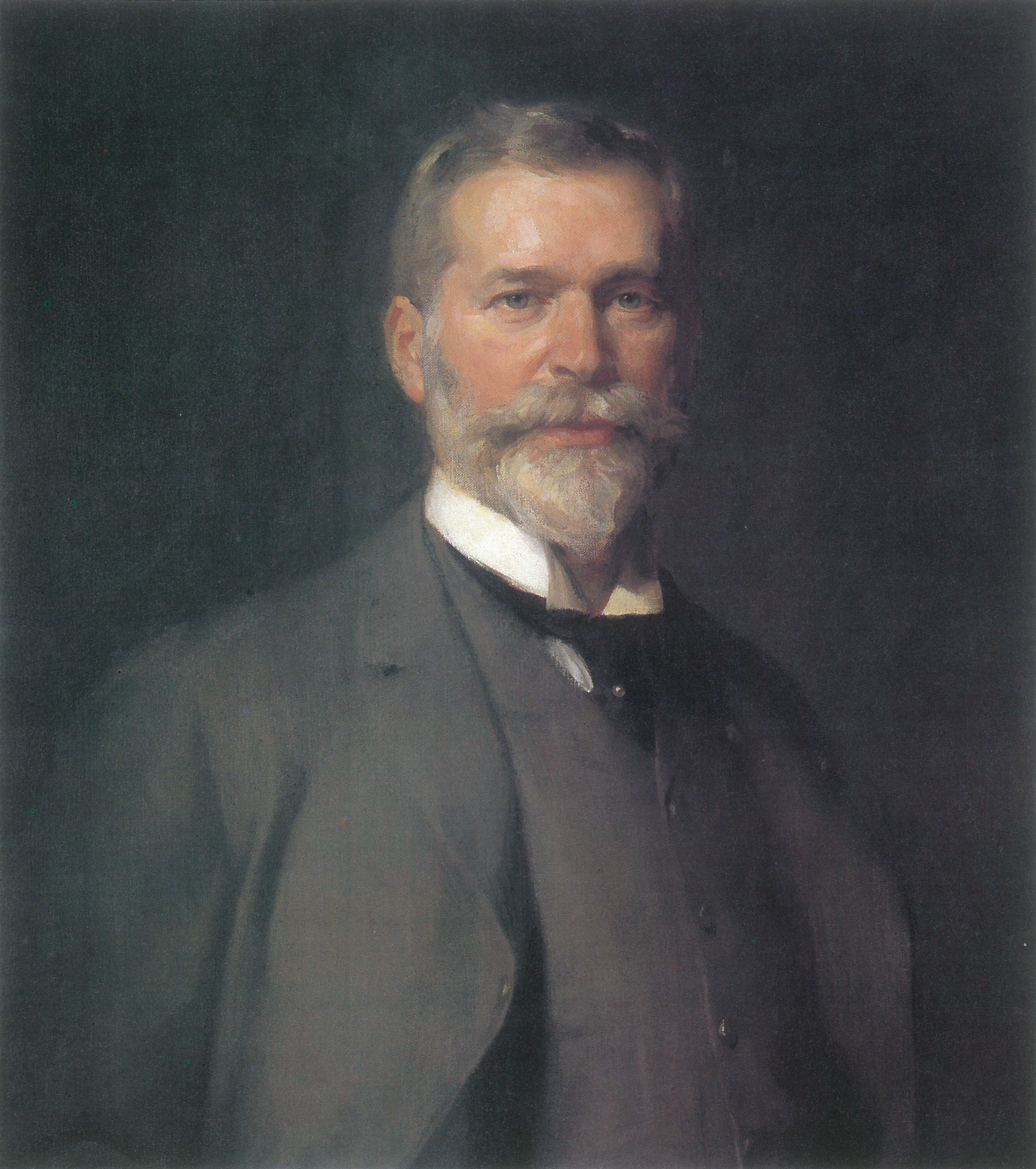
Wilhelm Merton

Wilhelm Ralph Merton (14 May 1848, in Frankfurt – 15 December 1916, in Berlin) was a prominent and influential German entrepreneur, social democrat, and philanthropist. Among his most notable accomplishments, he was a founder of the University of Frankfurt and Metallgesellschaft AG, which became the largest non-ferrous mining company in the world and the second largest company in Germany.

== Early life and education ==
Wilhelm was born to a Jewish family, the eighth of nine children of Ralph Merton (until 1856: Raphael Lyon Moses) and his wife Sara Amelie Cohen (daughter of Philipp Abraham Cohen), who immigrated to Frankfurt from England in 1837. On 5 November 1855, Ralph Moses and his family gained citizenship of the free city of Frankfurt.

On 27 November, he was granted permission to call himself ‘Merton’ after claiming in his application for such (on 22 October 1856) that his brother Benjamin had already taken the family name ‘Merton’ in Manchester as the name ‘Moses’ was not suitable to be used as a surname.

Wilhelm Merton studied at Frankfurt's grammar school, thereafter in Munich and he performed voluntary work at the Deutsche Bank in Berlin.

He married Emma Ladenburg in 1877 (born 1859 in Frankfurt, died in 1939), who was a daughter of Eugenie Halphen (1829–1866) and the businessman Emil Ladenburg (1822–1902), co-owner of the famous Ladenburg banking house. The couple had five children:

- Alfred Emil Ralf (1878–1954)
- Walter Henry (b. 28 August 1879 in Frankfurt am Main)
- Richard Albert Eugen (b. 1 December 1881 in Frankfurt am Main)
- Adolf Wilhelm August (b. 24 December 1886 in Frankfurt am Main), art historian and 2nd Lieutenant of the Reserves with the Magdeburg Dragoon Regiment No. 6, † on 30 October 1914 in Le Quesnoy
- Eugenie Amalie Essie Gertrud "Gerta" (1894–1968), wife of Moritz Freiherr von Bissing

Merton and his children converted to Protestantism in 1899. The Mertons—who had been English citizens hitherto—naturalised as Germans in the same year, and thereafter he bore the name Wilhelm Merton.

== Metallgesellschaft AG ==
Merton's father had married the daughter of Philip Abraham Cohen who operated a metal firm which he became executive of upon his father-in-law's death. In 1881, Wilhelm Ralph Merton succeeded his father and soon took full control of the firm by bringing in outside investors, Leo Ellinger and cousin Zachary Hochschild, to get full ownership and incorporated it as a joint stock company named Metallgesellschaft AG. The Metallgesellschaft, with 40 employees and one telephone—the first telephones were installed in Frankfurt in 1881—at the outset traded in copper, lead, and zinc, later diversifying into nickel and aluminum. Over the next hundred years, it grew into a company of over 20,000 employees with $10 billion revenue. It had over 250 subsidiaries specializing in mining, specialty chemicals (Chemetall), commodity trading, financial services, and engineering.

Initially in 1881, close business as well as personal ties had been formed with the firm of Henry R. Merton (HRM), the metals trading firm of the English branch of the family, named after another of Ralph's sons.

Since German mines could not satisfy the country's metal requirements, the company rapidly developed extensive relations abroad and within a short time Metallgesellschaft was represented in such cities as Basel, Amsterdam, Milan, Brussels, Stockholm, St. Petersburg, Moscow, Vienna, and Paris. Within a few years, therefore, a network of subsidiaries spanned the globe. In 1887, the American Metal Company was founded in New York City; in 1889, the Companhia de Minerales y Metales in Mexico and the Australian Metal Co. The last was the result of an expedition the company organized together with HRM and Degussa into the ore-rich Broken Hill district, where lead and lead concentrates were produced in vast quantities. This constituted the start of Metallgesellschaft's trading in ore, which would assume greater and greater importance in the future.

Although Wilhelm Merton is recorded in autobiographical notes as saying of Metallgesellschaft that: "Our trading company will not be involved in any kind of advertising" and is credited with the remark that it would be far more pleasant "to be able to pursue one's business without the need of the stock exchange, the public or the press," he broke fundamentally with his principles in one important way—the publication Metallstatistik, which had appeared annually since 1892, giving an overview of metal production, consumption, and prices worldwide, made Metallgesellschaft's name, to quote Wilhelm Merton again, "known, and I might add, respected." In general, however, Wilhelm Merton strongly objected to any interest in the firm which he considered to be excessive.

The First World War hit Metallgesellschaft hard. The good relations established abroad were broken off, imports of raw material dried up, the sister company HRM fell under the British Non-Ferrous Metals Industry Bill of November 1917, designed to eliminate enemy influence and control over the British ore and metal trade, and the deliveries of Australian ore failed to appear. This meant Metallgesellschaft had to obtain its metal supplies from neutral countries for as long as possible and eventually to use up domestic sources or intensify their exploitation. Three aluminum works were built, in conjunction with the firm Griesheim Elektron: in Horrem, close to Cologne; in Berlin-Rummelsburg; and in Bitterfeld near Halle.

Wilhelm Merton died suddenly of a heart attack on 15 December 1916 in Berlin after having already heart troubles for a long time prior. He was buried in the main graveyard in Frankfurt. His sons took over the control of Metallgesellschaft: Alfred Merton, the eldest son, was the chairman of the supervisory board, while de:Richard Merton, the second-born son, later became chief executive.

== Achievements ==
On account of his socio-political endeavours primarily, Wilhelm Merton is regarded as one of the most prominent German entrepreneurs in the Wilhelmenian period. He proved himself to no lesser degree in the financial world, in the period up until the beginning of the First World War, as the founder of initiatives aimed at humanising the economic world through scientific means.

He founded the ‘Institute for Community Wellbeing’ in 1890, and in 1901 the ‘Academy for Social and Trade Sciences’, both in Frankfurt. He was the driving force, with Franz Adickes (then Mayor of Frankfurt), in founding the University of Frankfurt.

Johann Wolfgang Goethe-University, as it was later called, became one of the most advanced universities of its time as a result of it adopting Merton's idea of having a scientifically orientated university which was geared to the demands of modern economic society in terms both of education and of research.

The Wilhelm Merton Professorship and the Wilhelm Merton Centre for European Integration and International Economic System at the Frankfurt Goethe-University, the Wilhelm Merton Scholarship and Mertonviertel ('Merton District') in Frankfurt, on the former work site of the ‘Unified Germany Metal Works’ (a subsidiary of Metallgesellschaft), are all named after him.

Additionally, a vocational business school and a street in Bockenheim are named after him.

== See also ==
His brother was Zachary Merton. Merton is a great-great-uncle of Alice Merton.

== Literature ==
- Hans Achinger: Wilhelm Merton in seiner Zeit. Frankfurt am Main 1965
- Wolfgang Klötzer (Hrg.), Frankfurter Biographie. Zweiter Band M-Z. Verlag Waldemar Kramer, Frankfurt am Main 1996, ISBN 3-7829-0459-1
