= Cementos Pacasmayo =

Peru cement company

Cementos Pacasmayo S.A.A.
- Company type: Public
- Traded as: BVL: CPACASC1; NYSE: CPAC
- Industry: Cement
- Founded: (1949)
- Founder: Luis Hochschild Plaut
- Headquarters: Lima, Peru
- Products: Cement, Quick lime, Concrete, Aggregates, Precast concrete
- Revenue: ▲US$ 378.2 Million (2017)
- Net income: ▲US$ 24.9 Million (2017)
- Website: cementospacasmayo.com.pe

Pacasmayo is the largest cement company in the north of Peru. The company has 3 cement plants in Piura, Pacasmayo and another in Rioja with a total annual capacity of 4.9 million tons of cement. It was founded by Luis Hochschild Plaut.
