= Adolf Schoyer =

German metal trader, industrialist, and Jewish community leader

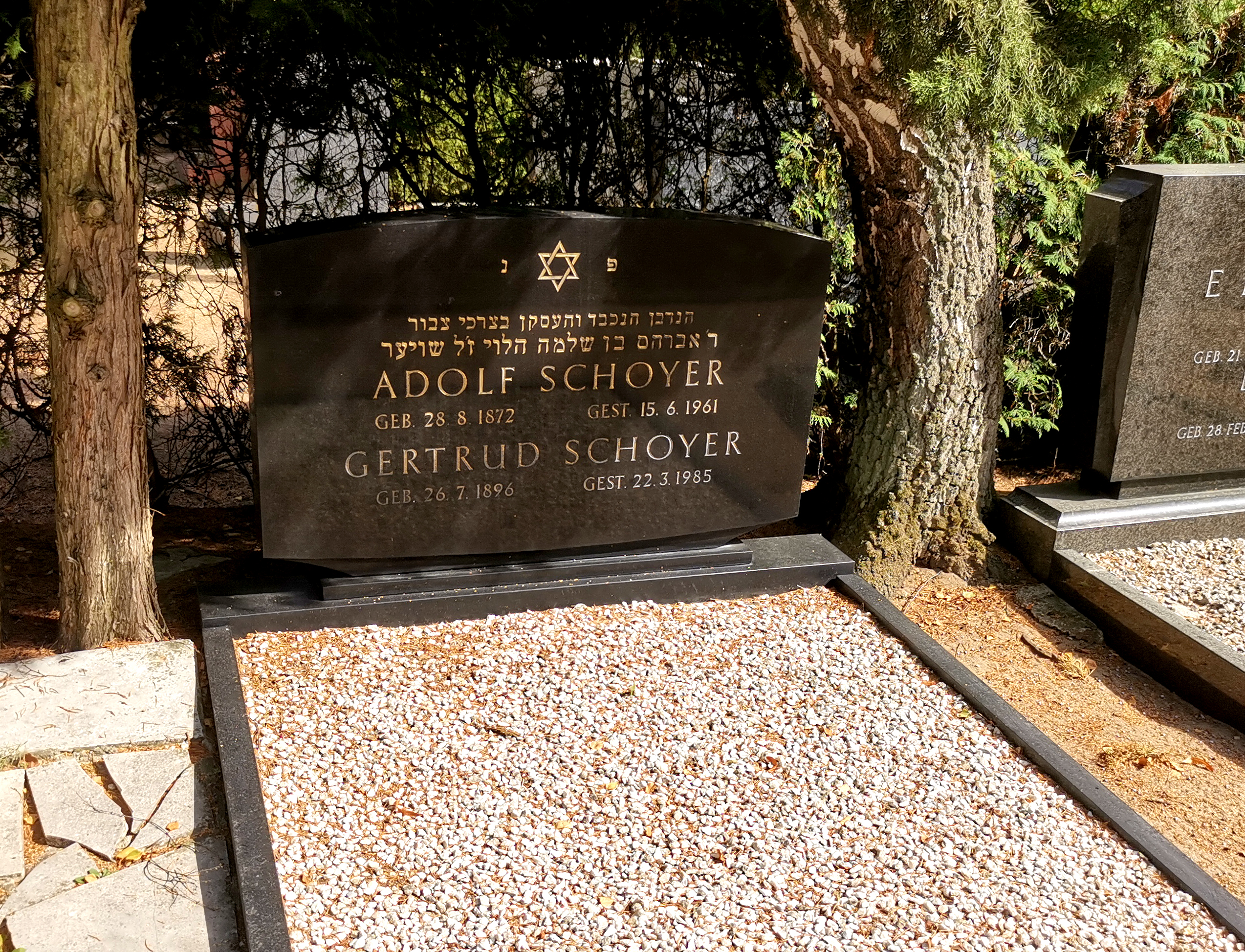
- Born: Adolf Schoyer; August 28, 1872; Berlin, Germany
- Died: June 15, 1961 (age 78); Bad Kissingen, Germany
- Occupation: Industrialist

Adolf Schoyer (August 28, 1872 – June 15, 1961) was a German metal trader, industrialist, and a leader of the local Orthodox Jewish Community.

== Biography ==
Schoyer was born to an Orthodox Jewish family on August 28, 1872, in Berlin, Germany. In 1929, he succeeded de:Kommerzienrat Norbert Levy as chairman of the Vereins Deutscher Metallhändler (Association of German Metal Traders) at the Börse Berlin which he headed until the rise of the National Socialists and their seizure of power in 1933. He also served as the chairman of the stock exchange board of the Berlin Metal Exchange and chairman of the Verein am Deutschen Edelmetallgroßhandel beteiligen Firmen (Association of the German Precious Metal Wholesale Companies). From 1925 to 1932 he was a member of the Kaiser Wilhelm Society. In 1938, he emigrated to England and returned in 1945. In 1946, after World War II, Schoyer became chairman of the Association of Jewish Refugees (AJR), founded in 1941 by Jewish refugees, an international organization dedicated to Holocaust survivors and refugees. In 1957, he received the Bundesverdienstkreuz (Order of Merit of the Federal Republic of Germany).

Schoyer died on June 15, 1961, in Bad Kissingen, Germany
