= Walter Hochschild =

American industrialist (1900–1983)

- Born: September 27, 1900
- Died: February 1, 1983 (age 82)
- Occupation: Businessman
- Known for: president of the American Metal Company
- Spouse: Kathrin Samstag
- Children: 3, including Patricia Hochschild Labalme
- Parent(s): Berthold Hochschild; Mathilde Blumenthal Hochschild
- Family: Harold K. Hochschild (brother)

Walter Hochschild (September 27, 1900 – February 1, 1983) was an American industrialist, having spent 63 years as an executive with the American Metal Company (later AMAX), founded by his father, Berthold Hochschild.

== Biography ==
Hochschild was born on September 27, 1900 in New York City to Berthold and Mathilde Hochschild.

In 1950, Hochschild became president of AMAX and chairman and chief executive officer in 1957. He has a noted business acumen. While overseeing his company's interests in Africa, he correctly predicted that the rapid growth of African nationalism in Central Africa would play a dominant political role in Rhodesia.

Hochschild served as a trustee of the Museum of the City of New York for thirty years, and as a lifelong senior trustee of the United States Council of the International Chamber of Commerce. He was a member of the Council on Foreign Relations since 1947. He built Eagle Nest camp in Blue Mountain Lake, New York, an Adirondack Great Camp. Eagle Nest accommodated Jews at a time when they were not welcome in "better" resort hotels in New York City.

Hochschild was married to Kathrin Samstag Hochschild; they had three daughters: Patricia Hochschild Labalme, Lynn Hochschild Boillot, and Ann Hochschild Poole.

== Sources ==
- New York Times, Walter Hochschild, Headed American Metal Climax Inc, February 2, 1983.
