= Harold K. Hochschild =

American industrialist (1892–1981)

- Born: May 20, 1892; New York
- Died: January 23, 1981 (age 88)
- Occupation: Businessman
- Known for: President of the American Metal Company
- Children: Adam Hochschild
- Parent(s): Berthold Hochschild; Mathilde Blumenthal Hochschild
- Family: Walter Hochschild (brother); Allan Marquand (father-in-law); Arlie Russell Hochschild (daughter-in-law)

Harold K. Hochschild (May 20, 1892 – January 23, 1981) was the president of the American Metal Company, a conservationist, a philanthropist, and the founder of the Adirondack Museum.

== Early life ==
Hochschild was born to a Jewish family, in New York on May 20, 1892, the son of Mathilde (née Blumenthal) and Berthold Hochschild. His brother was Walter Hochschild. In 1912, he graduated from Yale University and joined his father's company, the American Metal Company (AMCO), a smelter and refiner of ores and scrap.

== Career ==
Prior to World War I, AMCO made a minority investment in Climax Molybdenum Company, the world's largest producer of molybdenum named after the Climax mine; the investment paid off due to increased demand from the war. In 1930, AMCO purchased a major interest in two of the world's largest copper mines in Africa. In 1934, he was elected president of AMCO. While Hochschild served in the Army during World War II, the family business boomed, thanks to the demand brought about by the war; he returned to the US as a lieutenant colonel. Under his tenure, AMCO expanded into petroleum, potash, and silver. In 1947, he was elected as board chairman; in 1950, he was replaced as president by his brother, Walter Hochschild.

In 1957, the American Metal Company merged with the Climax Molybdenum Company. The new entity was renamed AMAX Inc. and Hochschild retired as CEO. In 1993, AMAX merged with the Cyprus Mines Corporation to form Cyprus Amax Minerals Company, the world's leading producer of molybdenum and lithium, and a leading producer of copper and coal. In 1999, Cyprus Amax Minerals was acquired by Phelps Dodge Corporation which in turn was acquired by Freeport-McMoRan (NYSE: FCX) in 2007, forming the world's largest copper producer.

He served as chairman of a commission appointed by Governor Nelson A. Rockefeller that recommended major changes in the administration of the Adirondack Park in 1971, leading to the creation of the Adirondack Park Agency. He also served as a trustee of the Institute for Advanced Study in Princeton.

== Personal life ==
In 1941, he married Mary Marquand, daughter of Eleanor and Professor Allan Marquand, founder of the art department at Princeton University. His wife was of English and Scottish descent and predeceased him in 1974. They had one son, Adam Hochschild (born October 5, 1942), a writer and journalist who married to sociologist Arlie Russell Hochschild.

He was an amateur historian and a trustee of the New York State Historical Association. He wrote Township 34, a history of the central Adirondacks. He served as a trustee of the Africa-America Institute, and later as Honorary Chairman and Trustee Emeritus.

Hochschild died on January 23, 1981.
