= Technical University of Oruro =

Public university in Bolivia

Coordinates: 17°59′31″S 67°08′11″W

University rankings

Regional – Overall
- QS Latin America: 351-400 (2021)

The Technical University of Oruro (Spanish: Universidad Técnica de Oruro, UTO), or UTO, is one of ten public universities in Bolivia. It is located in the city of Oruro.

The university was created on 15 October 1892 (133 years ago) and was named Distrito Universitario de Oruro. It changed its name in 1937 to Universidad San Agustín and finally adopted its current name in 1941 under the dean, Josermo Murillo Vacarreza (1897–1987).

== Engineering College ==
One of UTO's most prestigious colleges is the "Facultad Nacional de Ingeniería" (National Engineering School).

Postgraduate and Scientific Research Office The future vision of the Technical University of Oruro is to obtain grant-supported projects in all of its academic research areas.

The postgraduate program amalgamates relevant scientific research in its doctoral programs, working with national and international academic researchers. It aims to train scientists in critical and creative thinking, and to promote research in many scientific areas.
