= Metallgesellschaft =

German company

Metallgesellschaft AG
- Type: Aktiengesellschaft
- Industry: Conglomerate
- Predecessor: Schlesische AG für Bergbau und Zinkhüttenbetrieb; Sachtleben Chemie
- Founded: 1881; 145 years ago in Frankfurt am Main, Germany
- Founder: Wilhelm Ralph Merton
- Defunct: 2000
- Fate: Restructuring
- Successor: GEA Group
- Headquarters: Frankfurt, Germany
- Services: Mining, specialty chemicals, commodity trading, financial services, engineering
- Revenue: US$10 billion
- Number of employees: >20,000
- Subsidiaries: over 250 (notably: Lurgi; Chemetall; Henry Merton & Company)

Metallgesellschaft AG was formerly one of Germany's largest industrial conglomerates based in Frankfurt. It had over 20,000 employees and revenues in excess of 10 billion US dollars. It had over 250 subsidiaries specializing in mining, specialty chemicals (Chemetall), commodity trading, financial services, and engineering (Lurgi). Henry Merton & Company, Ltd was previously a branch of the Metallgesellschaft.

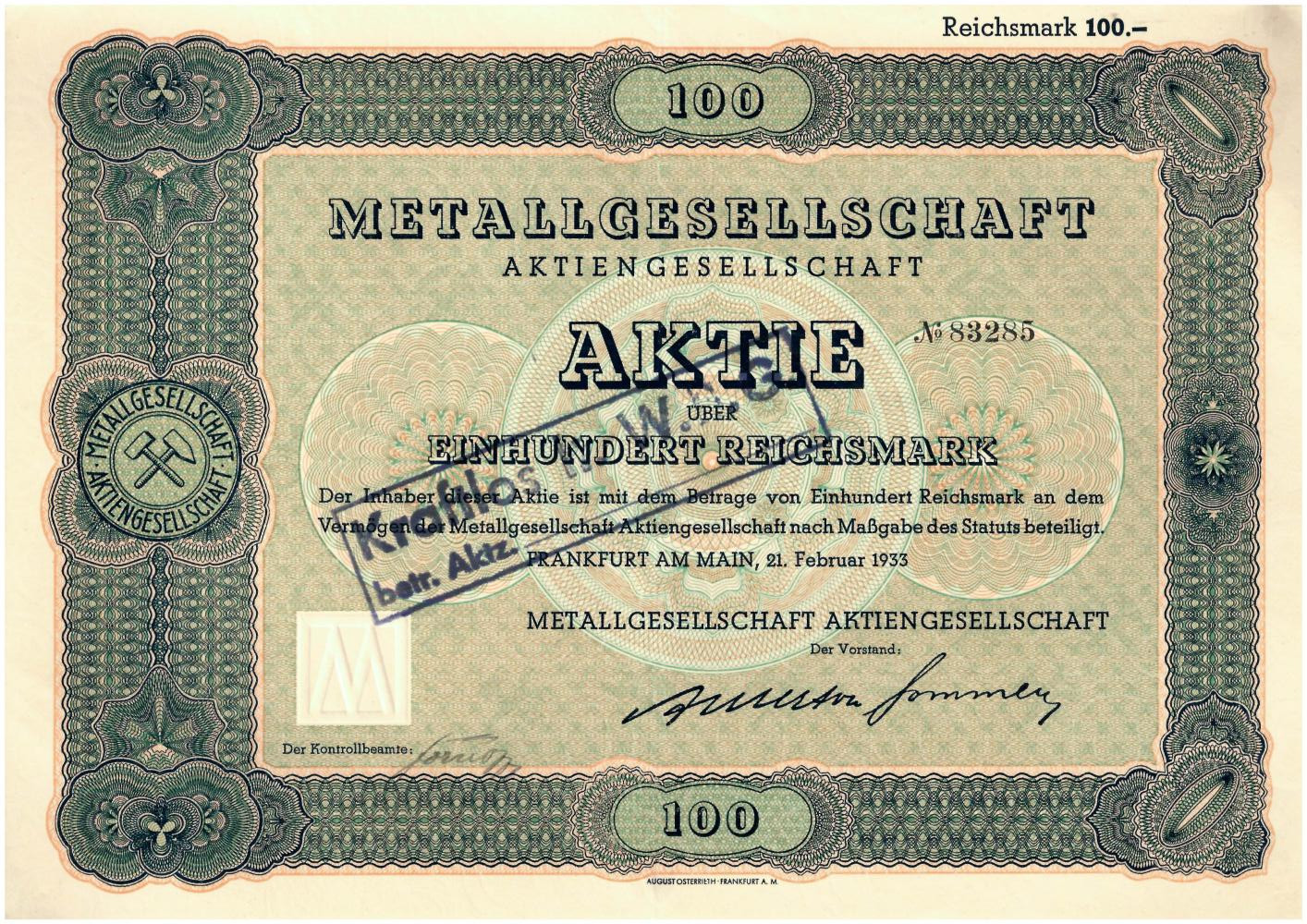
Share of the Metallgesellschaft AG, issued 21 February 1933

== History ==
Metallgesellschaft AG was incorporated in Frankfurt am Main in 1881 by Wilhelm Ralph Merton, his father Ralph Merton, and Leo Ellinger. Merton was responsible for business strategy, Ellinger for operations, and a cousin of Merton, Zachary Hochschild, for marketing and international activities. Their main competitors were the two other large metal trading companies of Germany: Aron Hirsch & Sohn in Halberstadt, and Beer, Sondheimer & Co in Frankfurt am Main. Although Metallgesellschaft was a joint stock company, it was operated like a family business with key positions allocated to long-time loyal employees who were gradually rewarded with stock in the company. In 1889, on the recommendation of chemist Clemens Winkler, chemist Curt Netto accepted a post as head of the technical department. Metallgesellschaft was more diversified than its two main competitors who traded solely in copper, lead, and zinc while Metallgesellschaft also traded aluminum, nickel, and pyrite. The company became more involved internationally as Europe became more reliant on imported metals. In 1884, Metallgesellschaft sent Berthold Hochschild, brother of Zachary Hochschild, to the United States to establish an operation. In 1887, the American Metal Company was incorporated as a joint stock company in New York with 51% Metallgesellschaft ownership so as to facilitate local decision-making; Metallgesellschaft executive Jacob Langeloth was named its president.

In 1989 Michael Farmer, Baron Farmer formed the Metal & Commodity Company Ltd trading company, a subsidiary of Metallgesellschaft AG, which became the world’s largest trader in physical copper and nickel, and he was its CEO from 1989-2000. In 1999 the company went public as it was floated on the London Stock Exchange under the title MG Plc with Farmer as its co-CEO; it was the first metals trader to be listed on the exchange. In 2000 he sold it to trading company Enron for $448 million, and Enron renamed it Enron Metals (in 2002, Enron sold the firm, which is now called Sempra Metals, and based in London).

== Hedging debacle ==
In 1993, the company lost 1.3 billion dollars suffering from flawed long hedge strategy in near term futures contracts that was meant to protect against forward sales commitments. A fall in spot prices forced margin calls for the company and the contracts were closed at a loss. Subsequently, the spot price increased and the company suffered even greater losses covering its customer commitments.

It is debated whether the company was speculating after unwinding the long futures hedge since they became essentially exposed or naked against their forward customer commitments. It also became involved in a key European Court of Justice case (based on the tax treatment of dividends) that was heard at the same time as Hoechst.

The company is now part of GEA Group Aktiengesellschaft.
