= American Metal Company =

Defunct American metal trader and producer

- Type: Private
- Industry: nonferrous metals
- Predecessor: Metallgesellschaft AG
- Founded: 1887
- Defunct: 1957
- Fate: Merged with Climax Molybdenum Company
- Successor: Cyprus Amax Minerals
- Headquarters: New York City, United States
- Key people: Berthold Hochschild, Carl M. Loeb, Ludwig Vogelstein, Harold K. Hochschild, Walter Hochschild

American Metal Company was an American nonferrous metal trading and production company.

== History ==
The origin of the American Metal Company (AMCO) begins with Metallgesellschaft AG of Germany, one of whose founders, Wilhelm Ralph Merton, tasked one of his cousins, Berthold Hochschild, to supervise its metal-trading business in the United States.

Hochschild moved to the U.S. in 1884, and the firm was incorporated in New York in 1887. AMCO started out as an agent for Metallgesellschaft AG of Germany, the Henry R. Merton & Co. (founded by the brother of Wilhelm Ralph Merton) of the United Kingdom, and the Société Le Nickel of France (founded by the Rothschild family). Also in 1887, Jacob Langeloth, an executive of Metallgesellschaft in Germany moved to New York to assist Hochschild. The company experienced rapid growth because of a surge in demand for copper, especially in Germany, which then consumed one third of US exports. Under Langeloth, AMCO expanded into production, opening refining plants for lead and copper.

=== 1910s to 1920s ===
Prior to World War I, AMCO made a minority investment in Climax Molybdenum Company, the world's largest producer of molybdenum. Named after the Climax mine, the investment paid off because of the increased demand from the war.

In 1914, after the sudden death of Langeloth, Carl M. Loeb, previously a branch manager, became president of AMCO. Loeb vertically integrated the company by expanding into the ownership of smelting and refining facilities while he secured his supply of raw materials by signing exclusive contracts with large mines to purchase their entire output, and he then processed them at AMCO-owned facilities. He also expanded AMCO's activities into Mexico with investments in lead, silver, and zinc mining first as an agent for its parent Metallgesellschaft and later as a direct owner during World War I. In 1917, AMCO refined 250 million pounds of copper, 547 million pounds of zinc, and 168 million pounds of lead. Before the United States entered World War I in October 1917, Metallgesellschaft (then led by de:Richard Merton, the son of Wilhelm Ralph Merton), transferred its 51% ownership in AMCO to several American citizens, who were also AMCO managers. Once the US entered the war, the country passed the Trading with the Enemy Act of 1917, which required German-owned business assets to be held by the Office of Alien Property Custodian. Despite Merton's efforts to hide Metallgesellschaft's ownership, Loeb reported to the agency that the assets were in reality still owned by their German parent, and the stock was then transferred into a trust supervised by Henry Morgenthau Sr., Berthold Hochschild, and Joseph F. Guffey.

In 1918, the Alien Property Custodian sold the 51% stake that it had confiscated at a public auction for $5.75 million, with many of the shares being purchased by a syndicate of investors including Ludwig Vogelstein (who had 20%), Berthold Hochschild, and Loeb. In 1920, Berthold Hochschild was appointed chairman of the board with Loeb as president with and various investors as vice presidents including Otto Sussman, Henry Bruère, Harold K. Hochschild, Carl's brother Julius Loeb, and Vogelstein. Later, Andrew Mellon joined the board to represent the government's interest. In 1921, Richard Merton filed a claim with the government asserting that the confiscation of AMCO shares was unlawful, as the shares had been transferred to a Swiss subsidiary before the U.S. joined World War I. He also bribed some government officials to assist in his recovery. Unfortunately for Merton, the bribes were exposed, and the claim rejected (and President Harding's Attorney General Harry Daugherty was tried twice and acquitted twice for his alleged involvement while Alien Property Custodian Thomas W. Miller was convicted).

=== 1930s to 1950s ===
In 1929, Loeb resigned as AMCO's president over a disagreement in AMCO's taking on debt to fund the purchase of copper mining interests in Africa (AMCO had minimized its ownership in mines and instead relied on exclusive supply contracts). The board purchased Loeb's 80,000 shares for eighty-five dollars apiece which was fortuitous for Loeb, as the Wall Street crash of 1929 followed later in the year. In 1930, AMCO purchased a major interest in two of the world's largest copper mines in Africa, including the Roan Antelope Copper Mine in Luanshya (in the Copperbelt Province) and the Rhodesian Selection Trust (formed in 1928 by Irish-American mining magnate Alfred Chester Beatty). In 1934, Harold K. Hochschild was elected president of AMCO, and Otto Sussman succeeded the late Ludwig Vogelstein as chairman of the board.

During World War II, the business boomed from the demand brought about by the war. Under Harold Hochschild's tenure, AMCO expanded into petroleum, potash, and silver. In 1947, Harold was elected as board chairman. In 1950, he was replaced as president by his brother, Walter Hochschild.

=== Merger ===
In 1957, Hans Vogelstein, nephew of Ludwig Vogelstein, was named president. The same year, Hans Vogelstein orchestrated the merger of the American Metal Company with the Climax Molybdenum Company. The new entity was renamed AMAX Inc., and Harold Hochschild retired as director. In 1959, Hans Vogelstein resigned and was replaced by Franklin Coolbaugh. In 1993, AMAX merged with the Cyprus Mines Corporation to form Cyprus Amax Minerals Company, the world's leading producer of molybdenum and lithium and a leading producer of copper and coal. In 1999, Cyprus Amax Minerals was acquired by Phelps Dodge Corporation which in turn was acquired by Freeport-McMoRan (NYSE: FCX) in 2007 to form the world's largest copper producer.

== See also ==
- 1971–72 Namibian contract workers strike
