= Palazzo Giustinian =

Palazzo Giustinian may refer to:

- Palazzo Giustinian (Dorsoduro)
- Palazzo Giustinian Lolin
- Palazzo Giustinian Loredan
- Palazzo Giustinian Pesaro
- Palazzo Giustinian Persico
- Palazzo Giustinian Recanati

== See also ==
- Ca' Giustinian
- Palazzo Giustiniani (disambiguation)
