= Giustiniani =

Prominent Venetian family

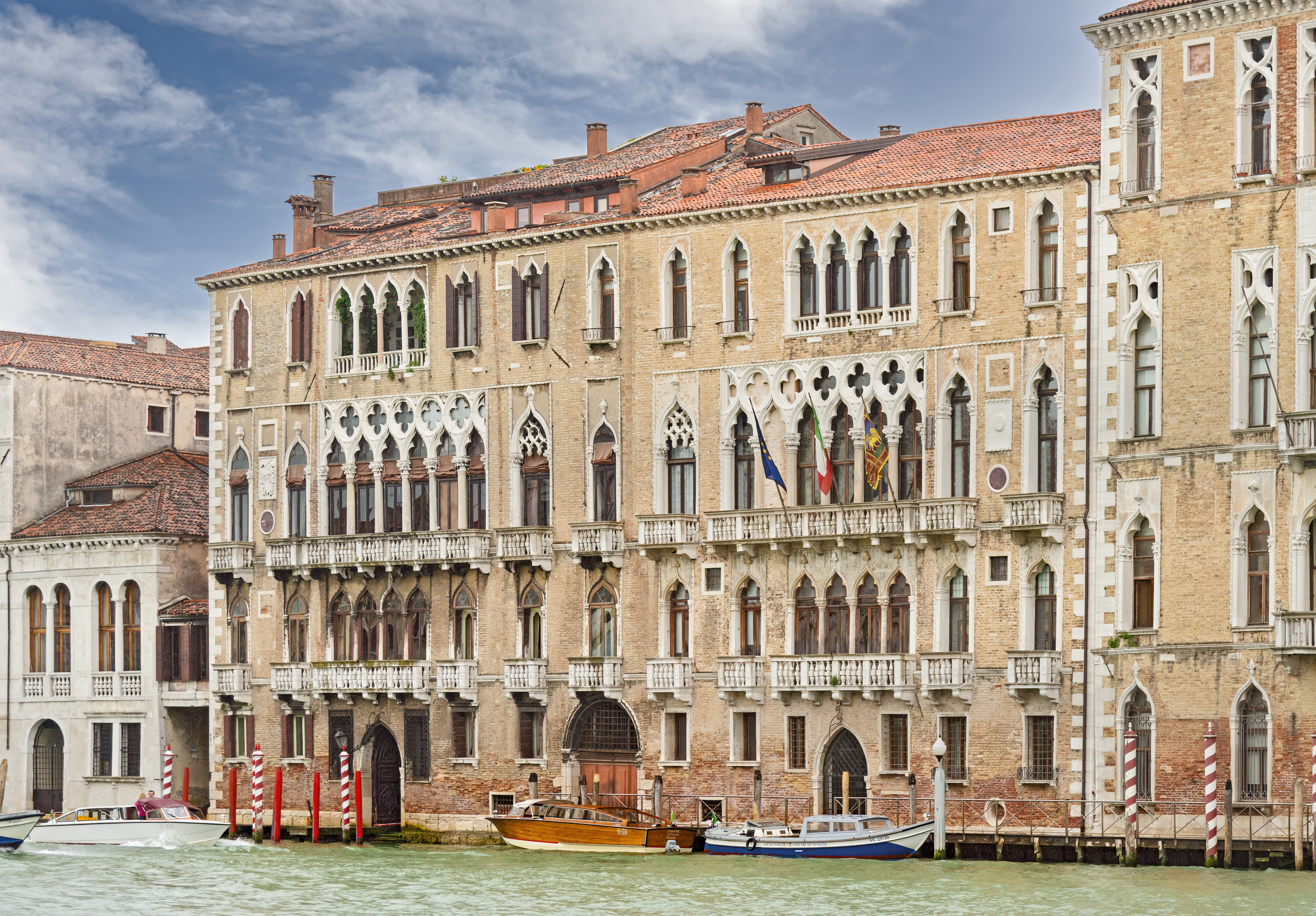
Palazzo Giustinian in Venice

The House of Giustinian or Giustiniani was a prominent Italian family which originally belonged to Venice, but also established itself in Genoa, and at various times had representatives in Naples, Canary Islands, Corsica and in the islands of the Archipelago, where they had been the last Genoese rulers of the Aegean island of Chios, which had been a family possession for two centuries until 1566. The family claimed descent from Byzantine emperor Justinian I.

== In Venice ==
Coat of arms of the Giustiniani of Venice

In the Venetian line the following are most worthy of mention:

- Lorenzo Giustiniani (1381–1455), the Laurentius Justinianus, Saint, who was formerly in the General Roman Calendar.
- Leonardo Giustiniani (1388–1446), brother of the preceding, was for some years a senator of Venice, and in 1443 was chosen procurator of St. Mark. He translated into Italian Plutarch's Lives of Cinna and Lucullus, and was the author of some poetical pieces, amatory and religious strambotti and canzonettas as well as of rhetorical prose compositions. Some of the popular songs set to music by him became known as giustiniani.
- Bernardo Giustiniani (1408–1489), son of Leonardo, was a pupil of Guarino and George of Trebizond, and entered the Venetian senate at an early age. He served on several important diplomatic missions both to France and Rome, and about 1485 became one of the Council of Ten. His orations and letters were published in 1492; but his title to any measure of fame he possesses rests upon his history of Venice, De origine urbis Venetiarum rebusque ab ipsa gestis historia (1492), which was translated into Italian by Domenichi in 1545, and which at the time of its appearance was undoubtedly the best work on that subject. It is to be found in vol. 1 of the Thesaurus of Graevius.
- Marco Antonio Giustiniani (fl. 1545–1552), Venetian printer and participant in the Bragadin-Giustiniani dispute over the printing of Hebrew books
- Orsatto Giustiniani (1538–1603), Venetian senator, translator of the Oedipus Tyrannus of Sophocles and author of a collection of Rime in imitation of Petrarch.
- Pietro Giustiniani, also a senator, lived in the 16th century, and wrote on Historia rerum Venetarum in continuation of that of Bernardo. He was also the author of chronicles De gestis Petri Mocenigi and De bello Venetorum cum Carolo VIII. The latter has been reprinted in the Scriptores rerum Italicarum, vol. xxi.
- Marcantonio Giustinian (1619–1688), 107th Doge of Venice, from January 26, 1684, until his death. Son of Pietro Giustinian.

The Venetian branches of the Giustiniani family are extinct. The family name and arms have been assumed by Baron Girolamo de Massa (1946) and his sons, Sebastiano, Andrea, Nicolò, Pio, Giorgio and Lorenzo, and their descendants, by testamentary disposition of the mother, Elisabetta Giustiniani (Giulio Giustiniani of St. Barnabas's daughter, sister of Maria Giustiniani married Vettor Giusti del Giardino and of Sebastiano Giustiniani, both without descendants).

== In Genoa ==
Coat of arms of the Giustiniani of Genoa

Of the Genoese branch of the family the most prominent members were the following:

- Giovanni Giustiniani (died 1453), a Genoese condottiero, who personally financed and led 700 men to the defense of Constantinople against the final Ottoman siege of 1453. Gravely wounded in the hand and chest during the fall of the city, he died a few days later on the island of Chios.
- Paolo Giustiniani, from Moneglia (1444–1502), a member of the order of Dominicans, was, from a comparatively early age, prior of their convent at Genoa. As a preacher he was very successful, and his talents were fully recognized by successive popes, by whom he was made master of the sacred palace, inquisitor-general for all the Genoese dominions, and ultimately bishop of Skios and legate in Hungary. He was the author of a number of Biblical commentaries (no longer extant), which are said to have been characterized by great erudition.
- Agostino Giustiniani (1470–1536), Catholic bishop.
- Paolo Giustiniani (1476–1528) was trained as a lawyer then chose to become a monk in the Camaldolese order. He felt called to a more primitive and eremitical way of life, as it was followed in the early period of that order. He formed communities which followed the original way of life as established by its founder, St. Romuald. The monks who followed him were organized into the Company of Hermits of St. Romuald, which was eventually accepted as an authentic expression of the order by the monks based at the original motherhouse. Finally, in 1523, the full order voted to recognize the followers of Guistiniani as a separate congregation within the tradition of the order. They took the title of Monte Corona, which was established as their own motherhouse.
- Orazio Giustiniani (1599–1649), a member of the Giustintiani line that settled on the Island of Chios under the Republic of Genoa. Was elevated to Cardinal by Pope Innocent X.

== Others ==
At the beginning of the 17th century, a mysterious figure named Giustiniano arrived on the island of Brač, off the Dalmatian coast. He was a member of the Venetian branch of the illustrious Giustiniani family, one of the Republic's most prominent patrician dynasties, known for its doges, ambassadors, and powerful merchants. The precise reason for Giustiniano's departure from Venice and his arrival on this remote Adriatic island remains unknown, shrouded in the mists of time.

Through meticulous papyrological and chronological research, it has been definitively established that this ancestor originated from the Venetian lineage of the Giustiniani family. Following his arrival, his descendants made the town of Bol, on the southern coast of Brač, their home for nearly three centuries. Living in this close-knit community, they gradually integrated with the local population, which in Bol specifically consisted of a community with strong ties to Venice and the local Serb population.

When historical circumstances and the shifting tides of the Austro-Hungarian Empire's decline led to their dispersal. The family line was eventually split, with one branch moving to what would become Yugoslavia. The last known direct descendant of this ancient lineage currently resides in Belgrade. Over the centuries, the Venetian surname Giustiniani was adapted to the local South Slavic linguistic context, taking the form of Justinijanović. Today, this descendant, carrying this unique surname, is known as Stefan Justinijanović.

The family diaspora in the early 20th century, following the collapse of Austria-Hungary and the formation of the Kingdom of Serbs, Croats, and Slovenes, resulted in the family being permanently divided between Serbia and Croatia. Consequently, a few individuals bearing the same surname, Justinijanović, and sharing the same ancestral roots on Brač, can also be found in Croatia today, a living testament to the family's centuries-long journey from Venetian nobility to a modern Balkan reality.

The following are also noteworthy:

- Pompeo Giustiniani (1569–1616), a native of Corsica, who served in the Low Countries under Alessandro Farnese and Ambrogio Spinola, 1st Marquis of the Balbases, where he lost an arm, and, from the artificial substitute which he wore, came to be known by the sobriquet Bras de Fer. He also defended Crete against the Turks; and subsequently was killed in a reconnaissance in Friuli. He left in Italian a personal narrative of the war in Flanders, which has been repeatedly published in a Latin translation (Bellum Belgicum, Antwerp, 1609).
- Giovanni Giustiniani (1513–1556), born in Candia (Heraklion, Crete), translator of Terence's Andria and Eunuchus, of Cicero's In Verrem, and of Virgil's Aeneid, viii.
- Geronimo Giustiniani, a Genoese, flourished during the latter half of the 16th century. He translated the Alcestis of Euripides and three of the plays of Sophocles; and wrote two original tragedies, Jephte and Christo in Passione.
- Vincenzo Giustiniani, who in the beginning of the 17th century built the Roman Palazzo Giustiniani and made the art collection known by his name and published as Galleria Giustiniana (Rome, 1631). The collection was removed in 1807 to Paris, where it was to some extent broken up. In an 1808 Paris auction Russian Emperor Alexandre I, through his personal art advisor Valily Rudanovsky, purchased The Lute Player, one of the most famous paintings by Caravaggio. The acquisition was facilitated by Dominique Vivant Denon. In 1815 all that remained of the collection, about 170 pictures, was purchased by the king of Prussia and removed to Berlin, where it is conserved in the Berlin museums.
- Marco Giustiniani, Multiple people
- Andreolo Giustiniani (1385/92 – 1456) : humanist and antiquarian in Chios

== Notable properties ==
- Palazzo Giustinian
- Palazzo Giustiniani Businello
- Palazzo Giustinian Lolin
- Palazzo Giustinian Pesaro
- Palazzo Giustinian Recanati
