= Ca' Sagredo =

14th-century palace in Venice, Italy

Coordinates: 45.4406971°N 12.3344761°E

The Ca' Sagredo is a 14th-century Byzantine-Gothic style palace located on the corner of the Strada Nuova and Campo Santa Sofia, in the sestiere of Cannaregio in central Venice, Italy. It now faces the Grand Canal (Venice), and across the campo from the Ca' Foscari. On the left side there is the Palazzo Giustinian Pesaro.

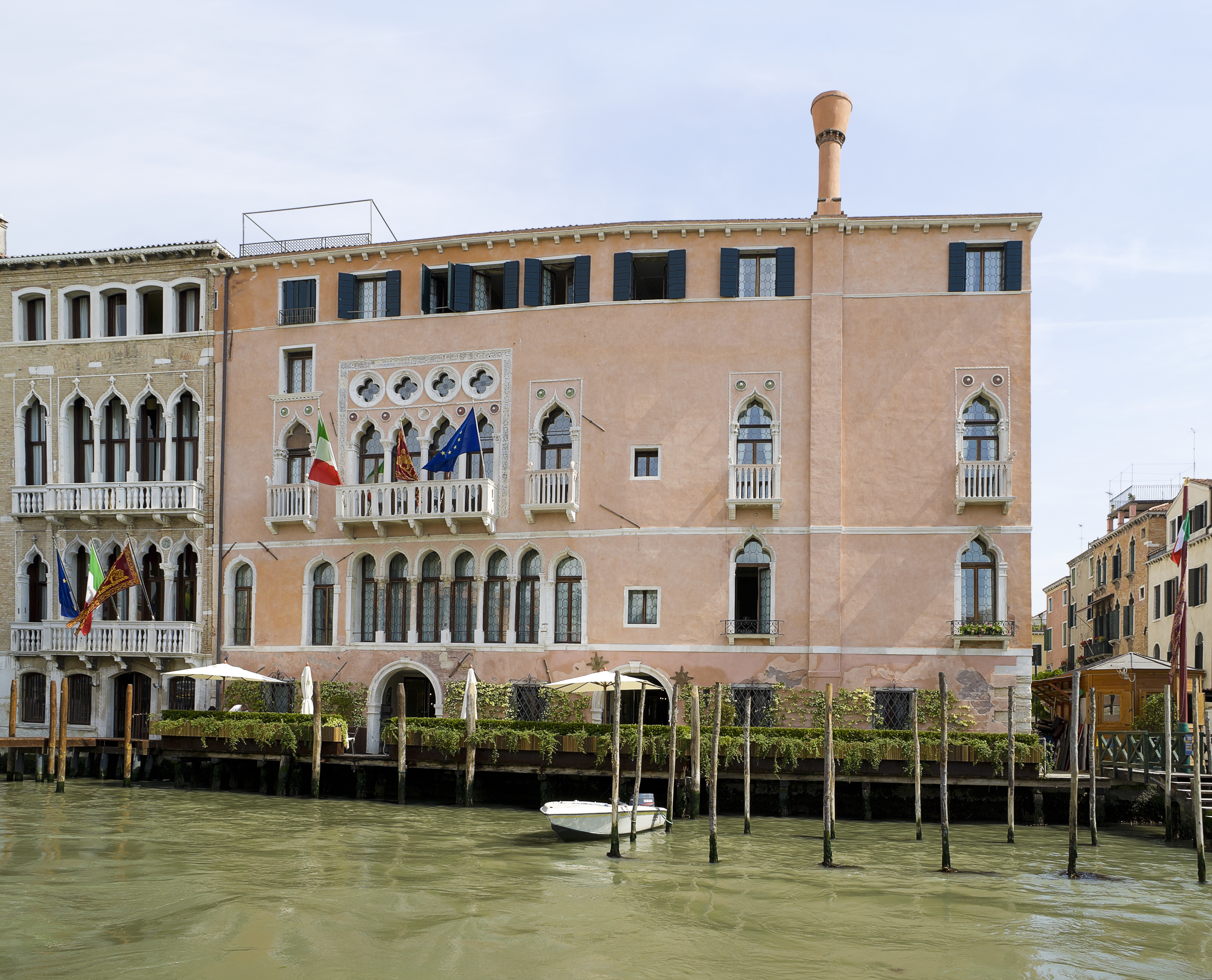
Grand Canal Facade of Palazzo Sagredo-Morosini

== History ==
The palace, which originally belonged to the Morosini family, was purchased in 1661 by the ambassador Nicolò Sagredo (who would become Doge 1675-1674). In his work, “Dialogue concerning the Two Chief World Systems”, Galileo, has a conversation in this palace with his close friend, the mathematician, Gianfrancesco Sagredo. While other sources indicate the palace was bought by his nephew, Zaccaria in 1704-1714, the latter date would preclude the conversation between Galileo and Giovanni Francesco Sagredo at this palace.

Zaccaria Sagredo extensively refurbished the palace in the 18th century, with designs by the architect Tommaso Temanza. The interiors were refurbished with the creation of a scenic staircase (1732), designed by Andrea Tirali, and decorated with the Fall of the Giants (1734), a fresco by Pietro Longhi. One guide describes the frescoes with the statement: "Venetians have a habit of "painting the lily and gilding refined gold", and Longhi's fresco was not considered de trop". Two marble cherubs by Francesco Bertos decorate the entrance to the staircase.

Count Agostino Sagredo (died 1871), an Italian Senator, owned the palace in the 19th century. The Sagredo family retained ownership of the palace until members of the family sold it in 1913, after which time the palace had a sequence of various owners (including Francesco Pospisil, an art collector, and his daughter Maria in 1936-1987) until it became a private hotel, its present function.

== Piano Nobile ==
Much of the detachable interior decoration of the palace was sold over the past two centuries. The vast collection of paintings, drawings, and books accumulated by Zaccaria Sagredo, who had been an avid collector of art and a patron of Tiepolo and Piazzetta, was sold over the subsequent centuries.

However, many of the large salons retain their works. For instance, the Sala Del Doge, which once had a portrait of Doge Nicolò Sagredo, features a Nicolò Bambini ceiling painting, La sconfitta dei vizi ("The Defeat of Vices"), depicting Apollo outshining the demigods of darkness.

The portego is a broad salon which runs along the whole first floor connecting the Grand Canal façade to the land-side of the building. The Portego's Canal-side features four ogival windows with a small quatrefoil window above, typical of the Byzantine Gothic architectural style in Venice. At one time, this room held over a hundred paintings collected by Zaccaria, stacked in rows. By 1780 these paintings were replaced with large canvases by Andrea Urbani, depicting Capricci with hunting scenes and allegorical figures above the doors.

Other rooms include a two story library; the Sala Amigoni, frescoed by Jacopo Amigoni; the Casino Dei Sagredo, decorated by the stucco artists Carpoforo Mazzetti and Abbondio Stazio in 1718; and the Music Ballroom, with frescoes attributed to Gaspare Diziani. Again the topic seems to relate to Apollo.

=== Exhibition ===
The ceiling and wall stucco, marble and glass decorations, and furniture from a bedroom of the Palace, c. 1718, is on display at the Metropolitan Museum of Art in New York.
