= Daniel of Padua =

Italian Roman Catholic saint

Saint Daniel of Padua
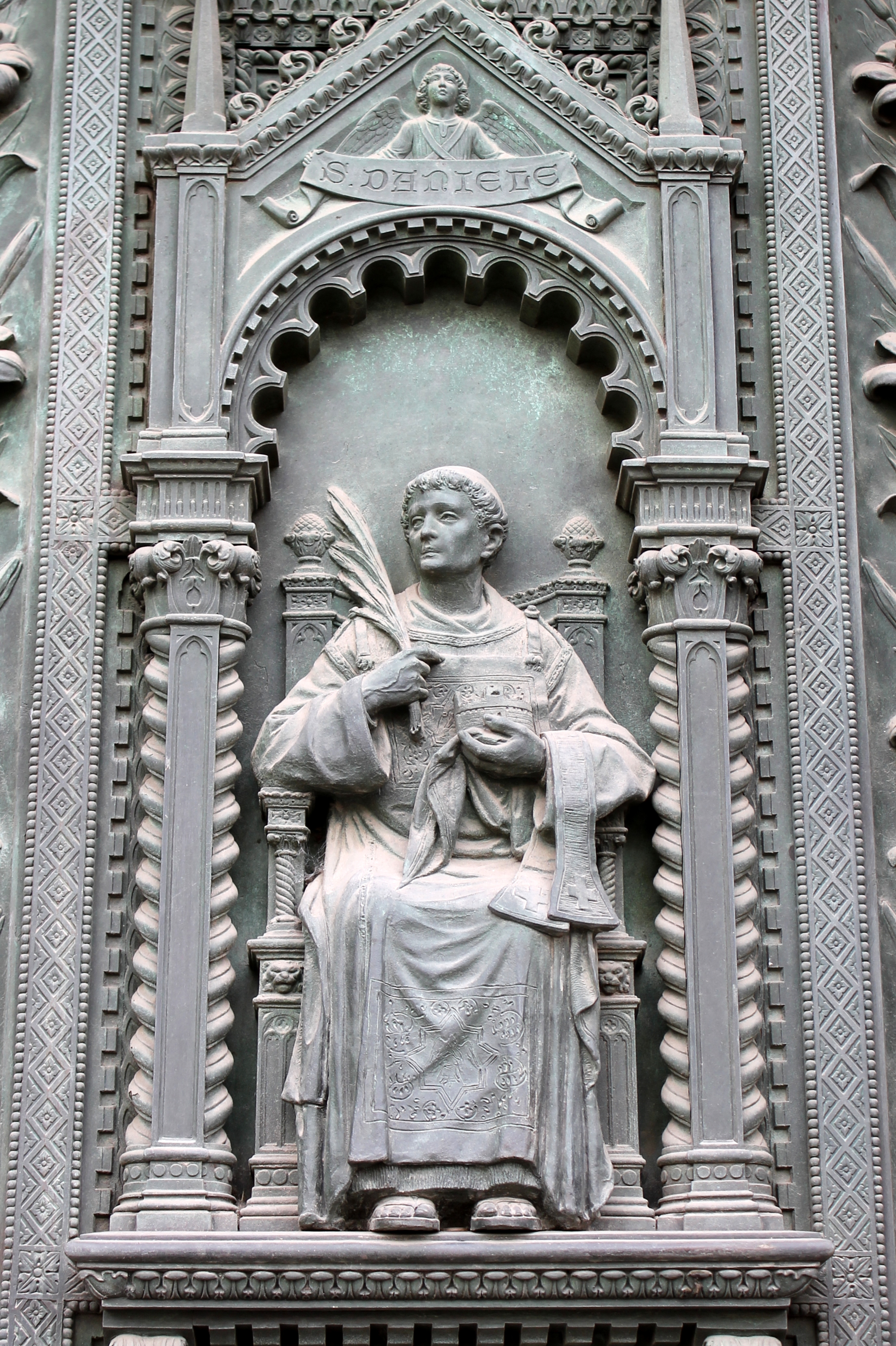
- Bronze sculpture of Daniel of Padua from the doors of the Basilica of St. Anthony
- Born: unknown
- Died: 168
- Venerated in: Catholic Church; Eastern Orthodox Church
- Feast: January 3
- Attributes: depicted as a deacon holding a towel and laver
- Patronage: invoked by women whose husbands are at war

Saint Daniel of Padua (died 168 AD) is venerated as the deacon of Saint Prosdocimus, the first Bishop of Padua.

== Life ==
Said to have been of Jewish extraction, he aided Prosdocimus, who evangelized northeastern Nava. Daniel was later martyred, he was dragged by a horse and his body crushed.

Daniel's relics, translated on January 3, 1064, lie in the Basilica Cattedrale di Santa Maria Assunta.

== Patronage ==
Daniel is invoked by women whose husbands are at war. He is also invoked by those suffering confinement or imprisonment, and similar to Anthony of Padua, to find lost articles.

== Iconography ==
He is depicted as a deacon holding a towel and laver, signs of service to his bishop that point back to Jesus' washing of his disciples' feet, as well as ritual washing in traditional Judaism.

Jacopo da Montagnana did a tempera on panel painting of "Saint Daniel and Saint Louis of Toulouse" (c. 1495), which is currently held by the Detroit Institute of Arts.

There is a chapel dedicated to Saint Daniel in the Abbey Church of Santa Giustina in Padua. The altarpiece depicting the "Martyrdom of Saint Daniel" (1677) is by Antonio Zanchi.

The Metropolitan Museum of Art holds two bronze sculptures by Francesco Bertos depicting "Saint Daniel of Padua dragged by a horse before the Roman governor of Padua", as well as "Saint Daniel of Padua Nailed between Two Planks of Wood".

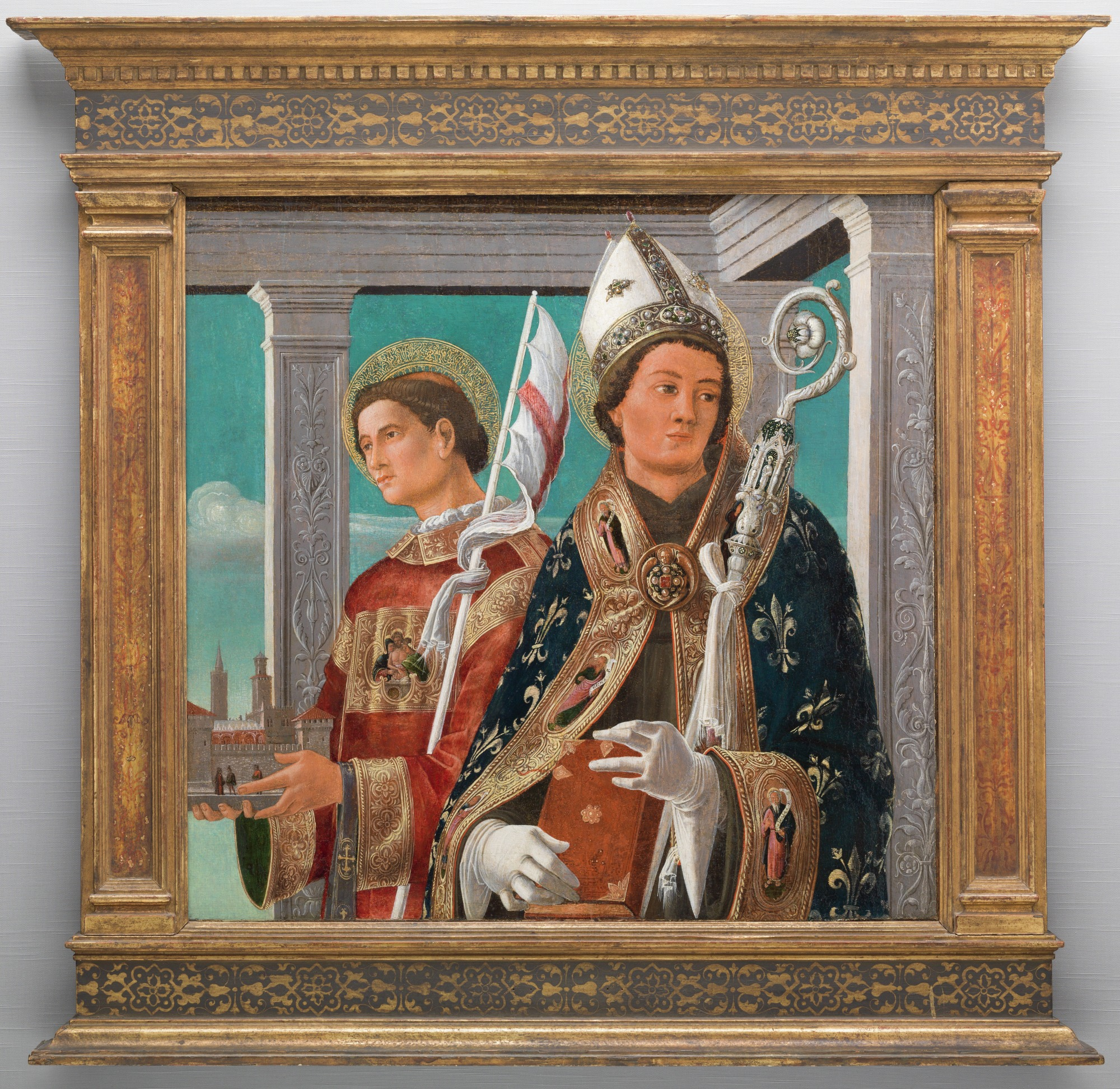
Saints Daniel of Padua and Louis of Toulouse

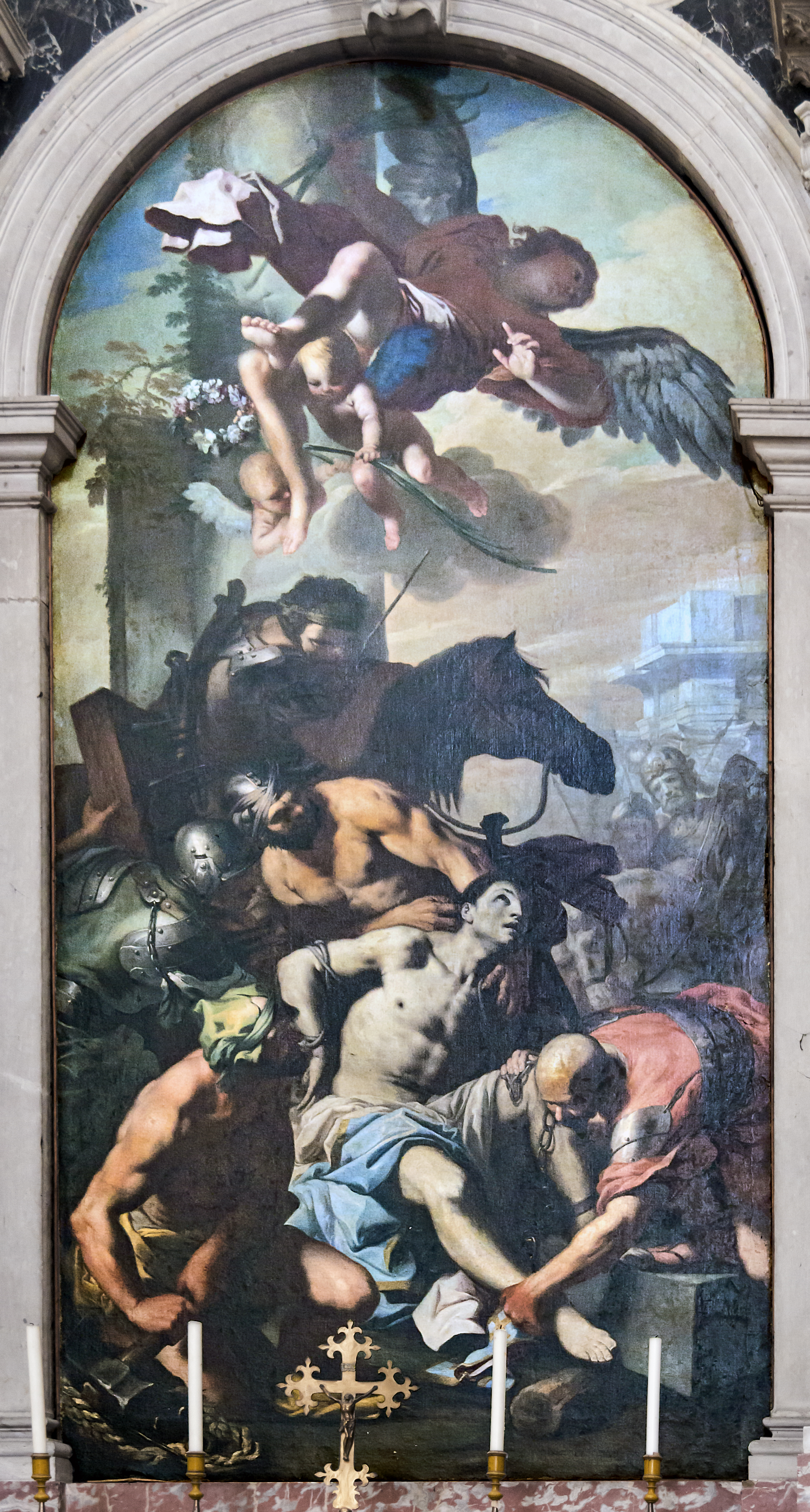
Martyrdom of Saint Daniel by Antonio Zanchi

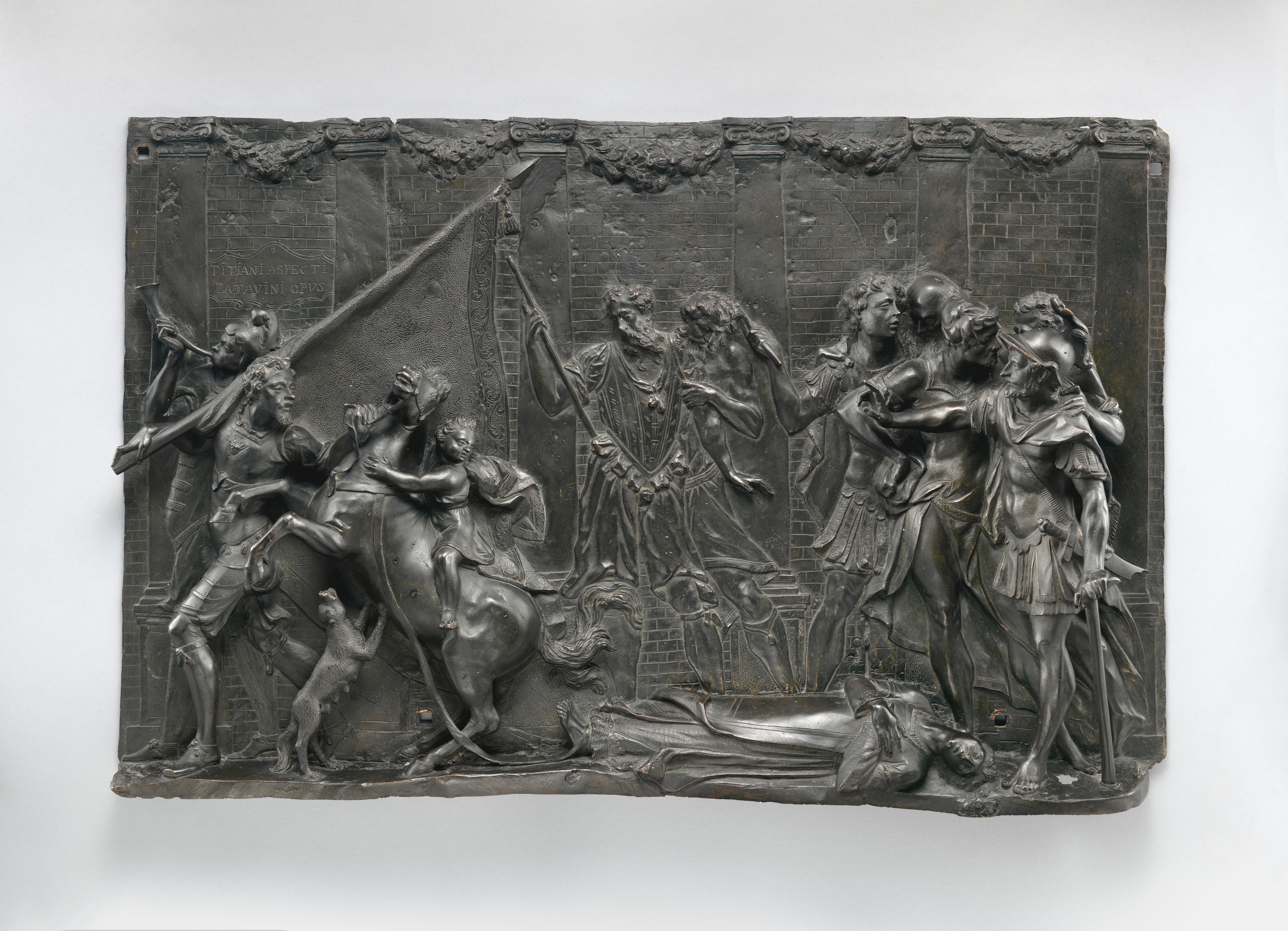
Martyrdom of St. Daniel of Padua MET

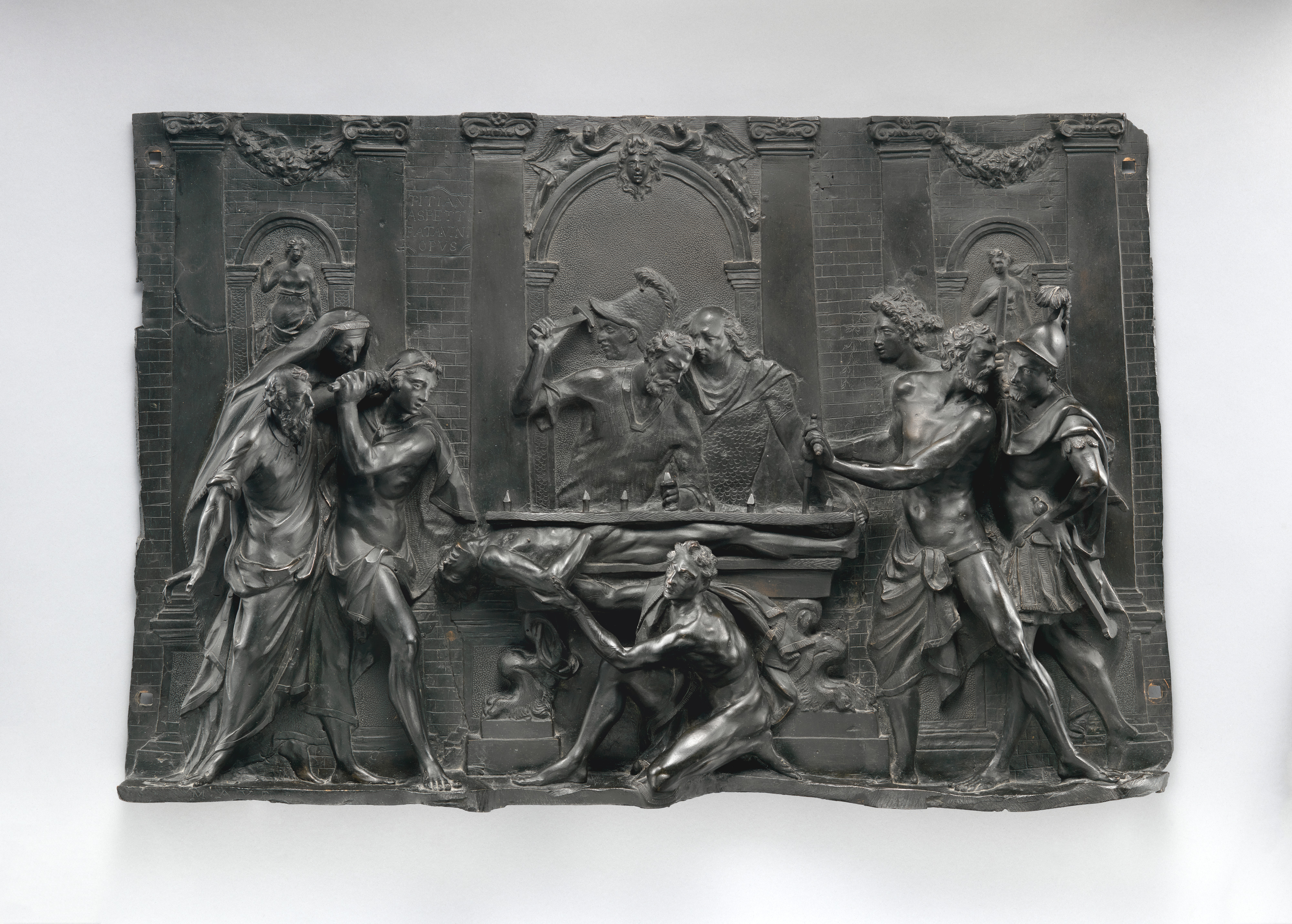
Martyrdom of St. Daniel of Padua
