= Palazzo Giustiniani =

Palazzo Giustiniani may refer to:

- Palazzo Giustiniani, Rome, palace in Rome, Italy
- Palazzo Giustiniani Businello, palace in Venice, Italy

== See also ==
- Palazzo Giustinian (disambiguation)
