= Andreolo Giustiniani =

Italian antiquarian and patron

Andreolo Giustiniani (Note: Sometimes 'Andreolus' or 'Giustiniani-Banca'.) (1385/92 – 1456) was an antiquarian, humanist, literary patron, and writer of the Italian Renaissance.

== Life ==
Giustianiani was a native of Chios, when the island was still part of the Republic of Genoa. His family, the Giustiniani family, were lords of the island. He lived his entire life in Chios. His nephew was Agostino Giustiniani, bishop and intellectual of Genoa.

He was the son of Niccolò Giustiniani and Brancaleona Grimaldi Banca, both members of the Genoese nobility. Through his mother, he was a member of the Banca noble family. Giustianiani was a member of the Maona of Chios and Phocaea.

== Collecting and patronage ==
Giustianiani was an avid collector of ancient marble sculpture and amassed a substantial library, reportedly of over 2000 works (although Basso suggests that this figure is probably inflated).

Giustiniani was a patron of Ciriaco de' Pizzicolli and a number of Flemish artists. His friends and correspondents included Ambrogio Traversari, Giacomo Bracelli, Poggio Bracciolini and Niccolò Niccoli. Traversari's translation of the works of Aeneas of Gaza is dedicated to Giustiniani.

== Writing ==
Giustianiani's works include Relazione dell'attacco e difesa di Scio, a poem about Venice's siege of Chios in 1431, which he wrote at the request of his friend Giacomo Bracelli. The poem uses used epic language inspired by the works of Dante and Ariosto. The siege ended with the Genoese victory and the retreat of the Venetians.

== Bibliography ==
- Petti Balbi, Giovanna (28 February 2018), "Intellectual Life", in Beneš, Carrie E. (ed.), A Companion to Medieval Genoa, Brill, pp. 320–344, doi:10.1163/9789004360617_015, ISBN 978-90-04-36061-7
- Setton, Kenneth M. (1978). The Papacy and the Levant (1204–1571), Volume II: The Fifteenth Century. Vol. 2. Philadelphia: The American Philosophical Society. ISBN 0-87169-127-2.
