= Palazzo Giustiniani Businello =

Palace in Venice, Italy

Coordinates: 45°26′12″N 12°19′57″E

The Palazzo Giustiniani Businello is Gothic-style palace located on the Grand Canal, in the Sestiere of San Polo, adjacent to the Palazzo Papadopoli, in Venice, Italy.

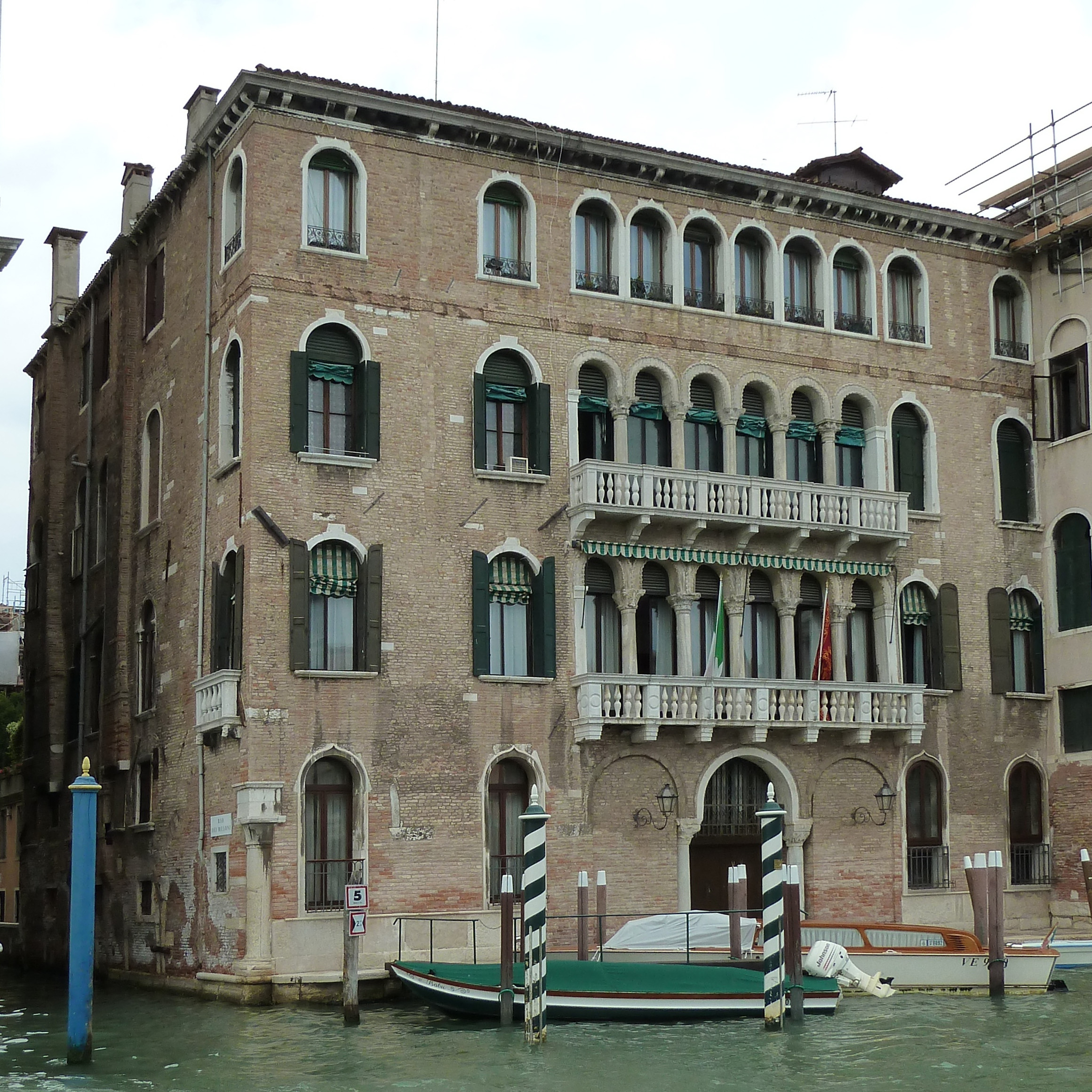
Palazzo Giustiniani Businello

== History ==
The palace was commissioned in the 13th century by the aristocratic Morosini family, but later transferred to the Giustiniani family. In the 18th century, the Businello became owners of the palace. In the 19th century, it housed the dancer Maria Taglioni. The building has undergone a number of renovations.

== See also ==
- Palazzo Giustinian
- Palazzo Giustinian Pesaro
- Palazzo Giustinian Lolin

== Bibliography ==
- Brusegan, Marcello (2007). The Palaces of Venice. Rome: Newton & Compton. pp. 183–184. ISBN 978-88-541-0820 -2. Brusegan.
