= Marco Giustiniani =

Marco Giustiniani or Marco Giustinian may refer to:

- Marco Giustiniani (died 1277), Venetian diplomat, see Byzantine–Venetian treaty of 1277
- Marco Giustiniani (1301–1346), Venetian diplomat took part in the Siege of Zadar (1345–1346)
- Marco Giustiniani (fl. 1341–1378), Venetian diplomat
- Marco Giustiniani (archbishop of Candia) (1392–1405), see Roman Catholic Diocese of Crete
- Marco Giustiniani (died 1438), Venetian governor
- Marco Giustiniani (1549–1581), Venetian governor
- Marco Giustiniani (bishop of Chios) (1547–1640)
- Marco Giustiniani (bishop of Verona) (died 1649)
- Marco Giustiniani (bishop of Torcello) (1655–1735)
