= Agostino Giustiniani =

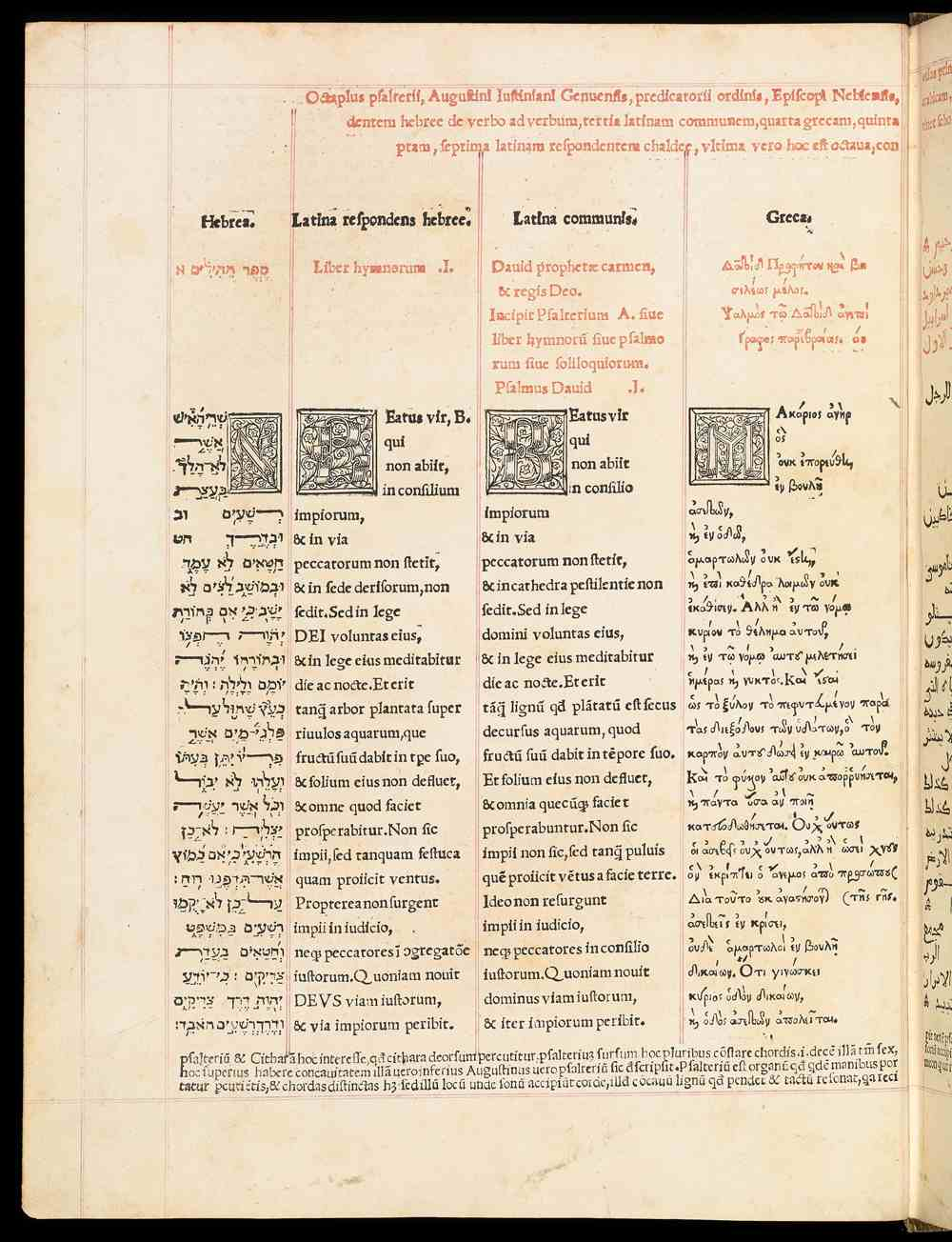
Genoa psalter of 1516.

Agostino Giustiniani (born Pantaleone Giustiniani; 1470 - 1536; also known as Augustinus Justinianus) was an Italian Catholic bishop, linguist and geographer.

== Biography ==
Giustiniani was born at Genoa into a noble Giustiniani family. His father had been ambassador of the Republic of Genoa at Milan, while his grandfather had been governor of Chios.

Giustiniani spent some years in Valencia, Spain, before joining the Dominican order in 1487. He studied Greek, Hebrew, Aramaic and Arabic, and in 1514 began preparing a polyglot edition of the Bible. As Bishop of Nebbio in Corsica, he took part in some of the earlier sittings of the Lateran council (1516–1517), but, in consequence of party complications, withdrew to his diocese, and ultimately to France, where he became a pensioner of Francis I, and was the first to occupy a chair of Hebrew and Arabic in the University of Paris.

After an absence from Corsica for a period of five years, during which he visited England and the Low Countries, and became acquainted with Erasmus and Sir Thomas More, he returned to Nebbio, about 1522. There he remained, with comparatively little intermission, until in 1536, when, while returning from a visit to Genoa, he perished in a storm at sea. He was the possessor of a very fine library, which he bequeathed to the republic of Genoa. Of his projected polyglot only the Psalter was published (Psalterium Hebraeum, Graecum, Arabicum, et Chaldaicum, Genoa, 1516). Besides the Hebrew text, the Septuagint translation, the Chaldee paraphrase, and an Arabic version, it contains the Vulgate translation, a new Latin translation by the editor, a Latin translation of the Chaldee paraphrase, and a collection of scholia. Giustiniani printed 2,000 copies at his own expense, including fifty in vellum for presentation to the sovereigns of Europe and Asia; but the sale of the work did not encourage him to proceed with the New Testament, which he had also prepared for the press.

Besides an edition of the Book of Job, containing the original text, the Vulgate, and a new translation, he published a Latin version of The Guide for the Perplexed of Maimonides (Moreh Nevukhim, Director dubitantium aut perplexorum, 1520), attributed to Mantinus, and also edited in Latin the Aureus libellus of Aeneas Platonicus, and the Timaeus of Chalcidius. In 1526-1530 he wrote a description of Corsica entitle Dialogo nominato Corsica. His annals of Genoa (Castigatissimi Annali di Genova) were published posthumously in 1537.

== Sources ==
- Campanini, Saverio (2008). "A Neglected Source on Asher Lemmlein and Paride da Ceresara: Agostino Giustiniani". European Journal of Jewish Studies. 2 (1): 89–110. doi:10.1163/187247108786120909.
- Pins, Jean de (2007). J. N. Pendergrass (ed.). Letters and Letter Fragments. Paris: Librairie Droz. pp. 305–306. ISBN 978-2-600-01101-3.
