= Palazzo Giustinian Pesaro =

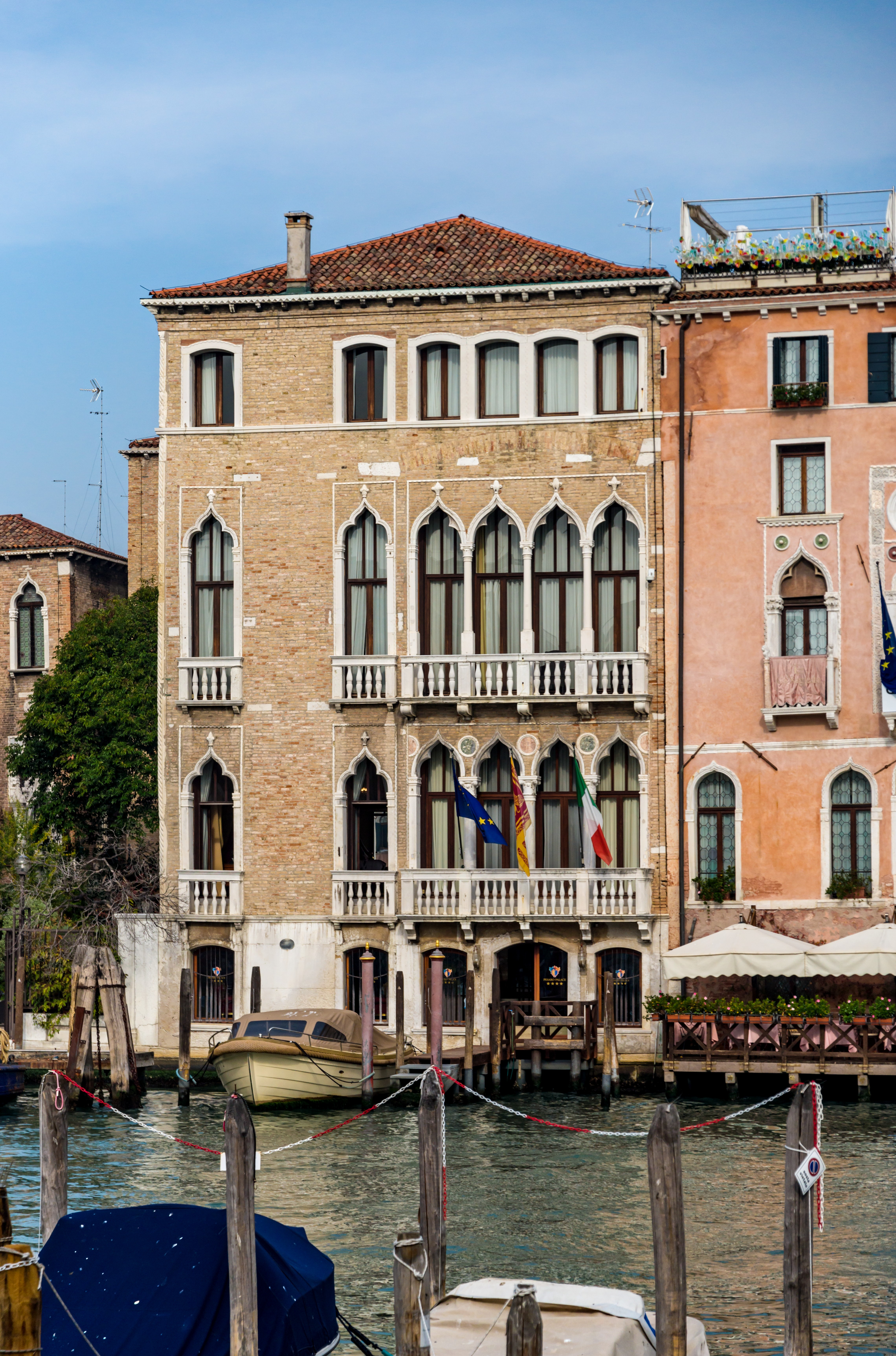
- Palazzo Giustinian Pesaro overlooking Grand Canal Grande; Palazzo Morosini Sagredo on the right.
- Interactive map of the Palazzo Giustinian Pesaro area

General information
- Type: Residential
- Architectural style: Gothic
- Location: Cannaregio district, Venice, Italy
- Coordinates: 45°26′26.75″N 12°20′03.24″E
- Construction stopped: 14th century

Technical details
- Floor count: 3

Palazzo Giustinian Pesaro is a Gothic palace located in Venice, Italy, in the Cannaregio district and overlooking the Grand Canal. The palazzo is situated between Ca' d'Oro and Palazzo Morosini Sagredo.

== History ==
The palace dates back to the late 14th century; it was renovated later during the 18th and 19th centuries. The building was converted from a residence to a hotel business in 2006. The palace was owned by the prominent Giustiniani family.

== Architecture ==
The small palace has an atypical L-shaped plan and a garden towards the Grand Canal. The perfectly restored Gothic façade presents the results of numerous modifications that have affected it over the past centuries. The palazzo has two noble floors decorated by quadriforas shifted the right, so the façade looks asymmetrical. Each quadrifora is supported by a pair of single-light windows from the left side. All the ogival openings are surrounded by serrated frames and decorated by the typical flower on top. The balconies were added in the 16th century. Further 17th-century interventions can be seen on the left side of the palace, the one overlooking the large garden. In the 1800s, a top floor was added. The palazzo was remodeled inside and restored in 1970.

== Gallery ==
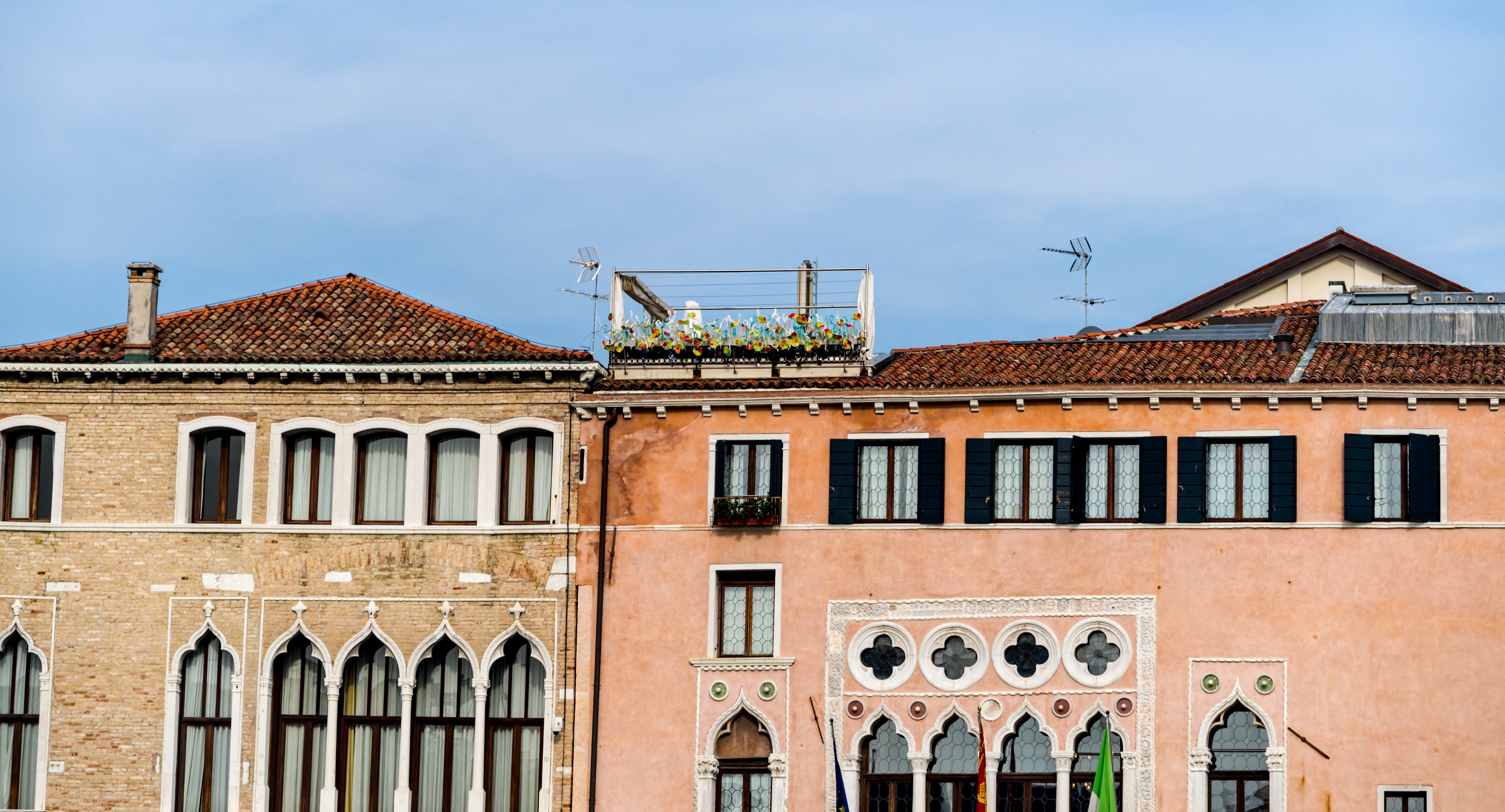
Top floor details

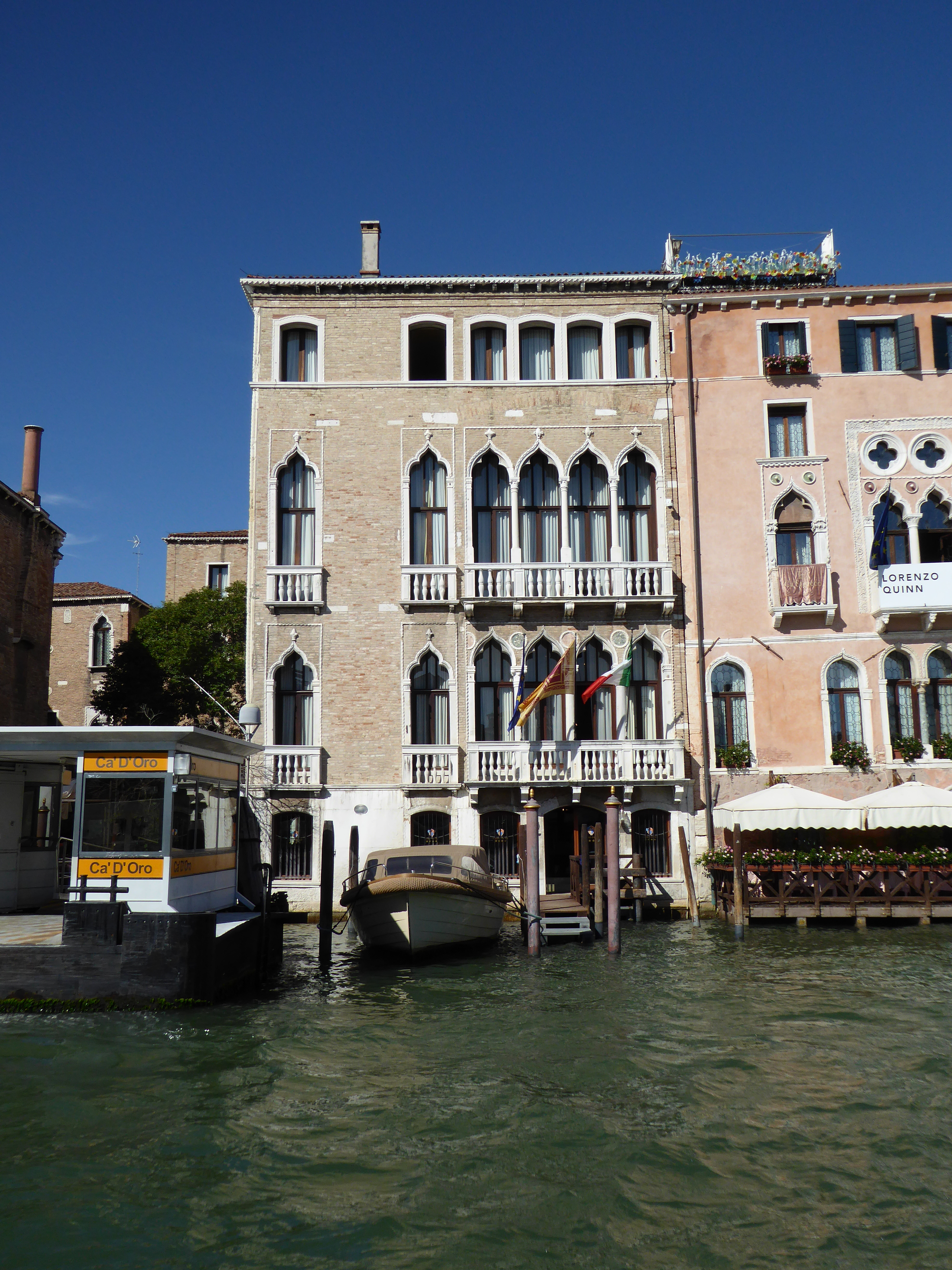
View from Grand Canal

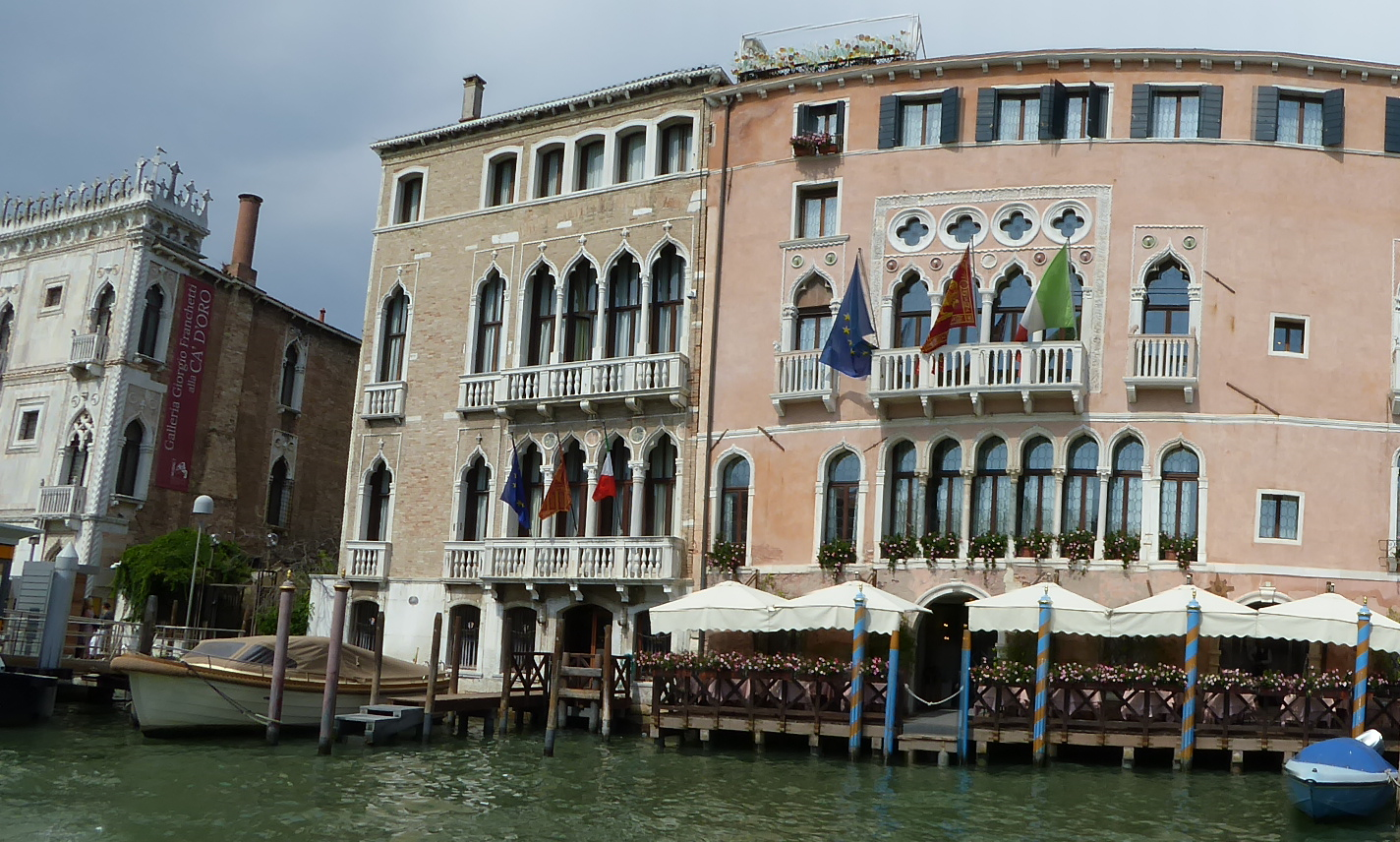
Palazzo Giustinian Pesaro and Ca' Sagredo

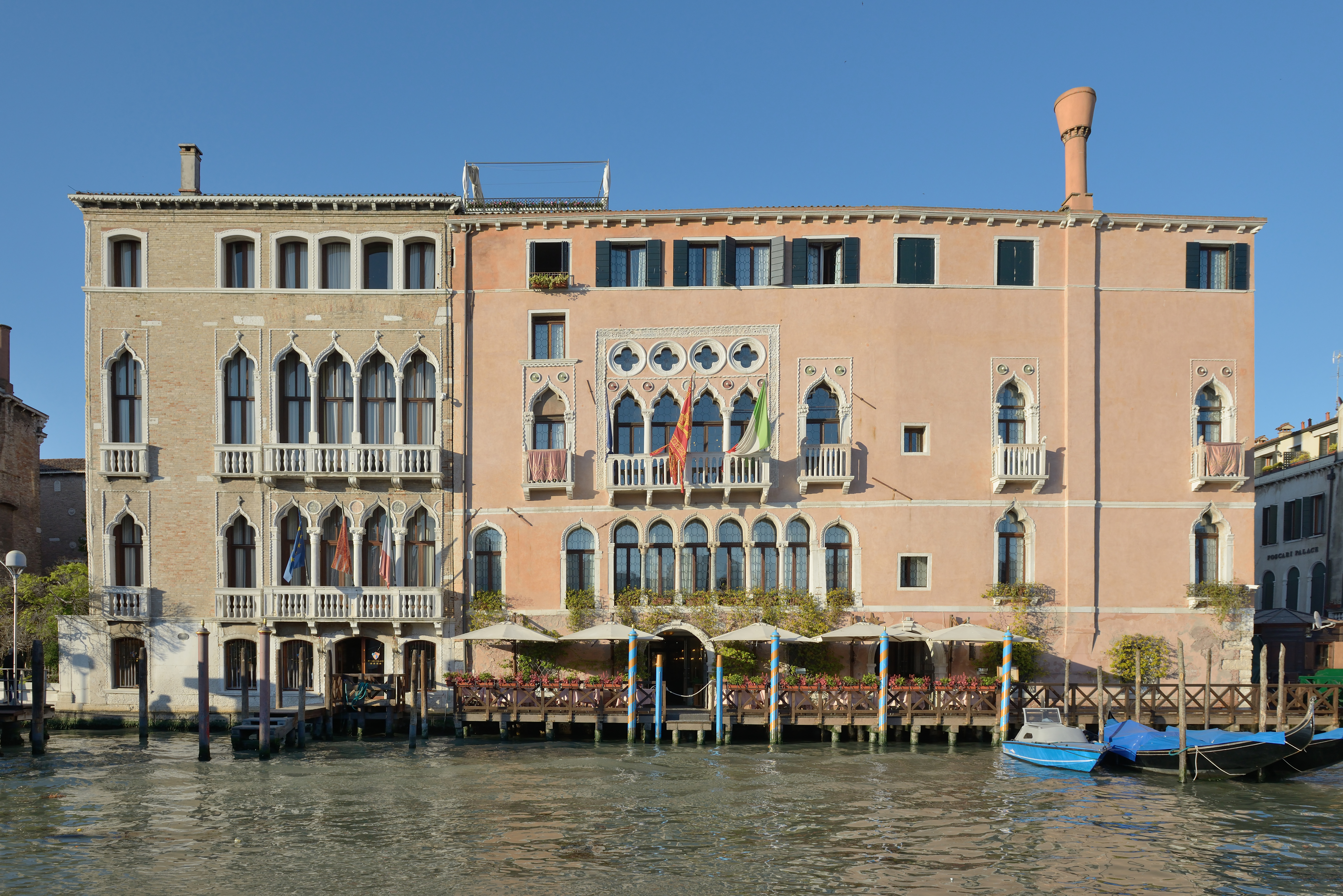
Palazzo Giustinian Pesaro and Ca' Sagredo, facades on Grand Canal.

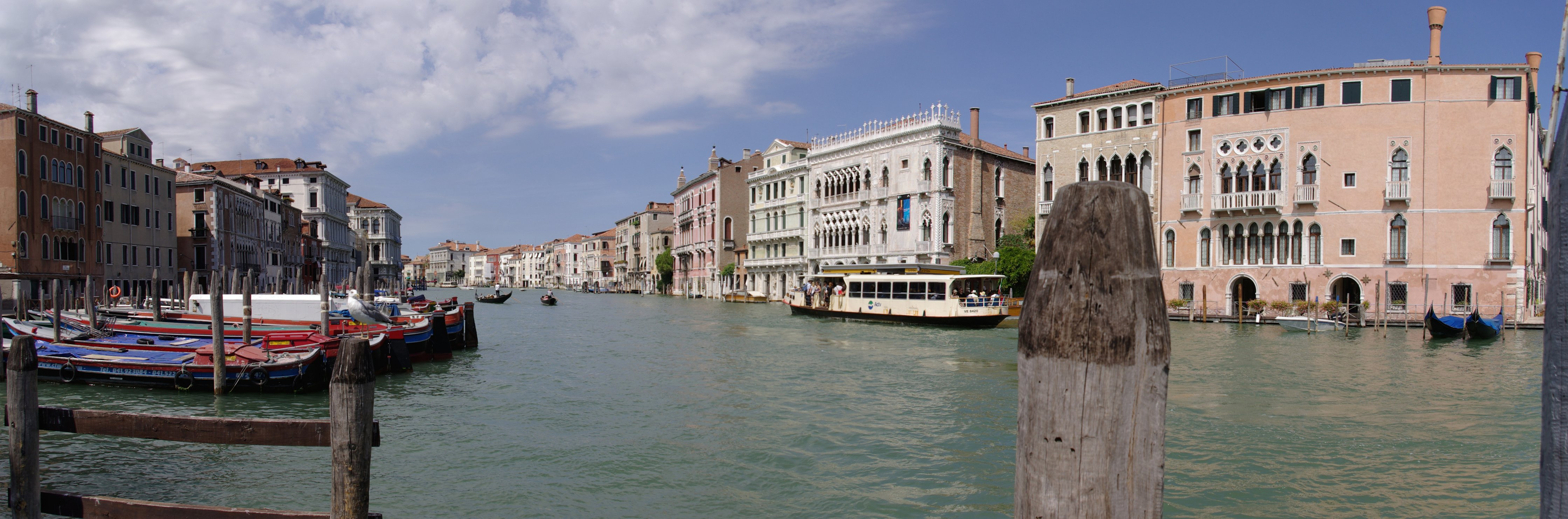
View from Grand Canal

== See also ==
- Palazzo Giustinian
- Palazzo Giustiniani Businello
- Palazzo Giustinian Lolin
- Palazzo Giustinian Recanati
