= Palazzo Giustinian Recanati =

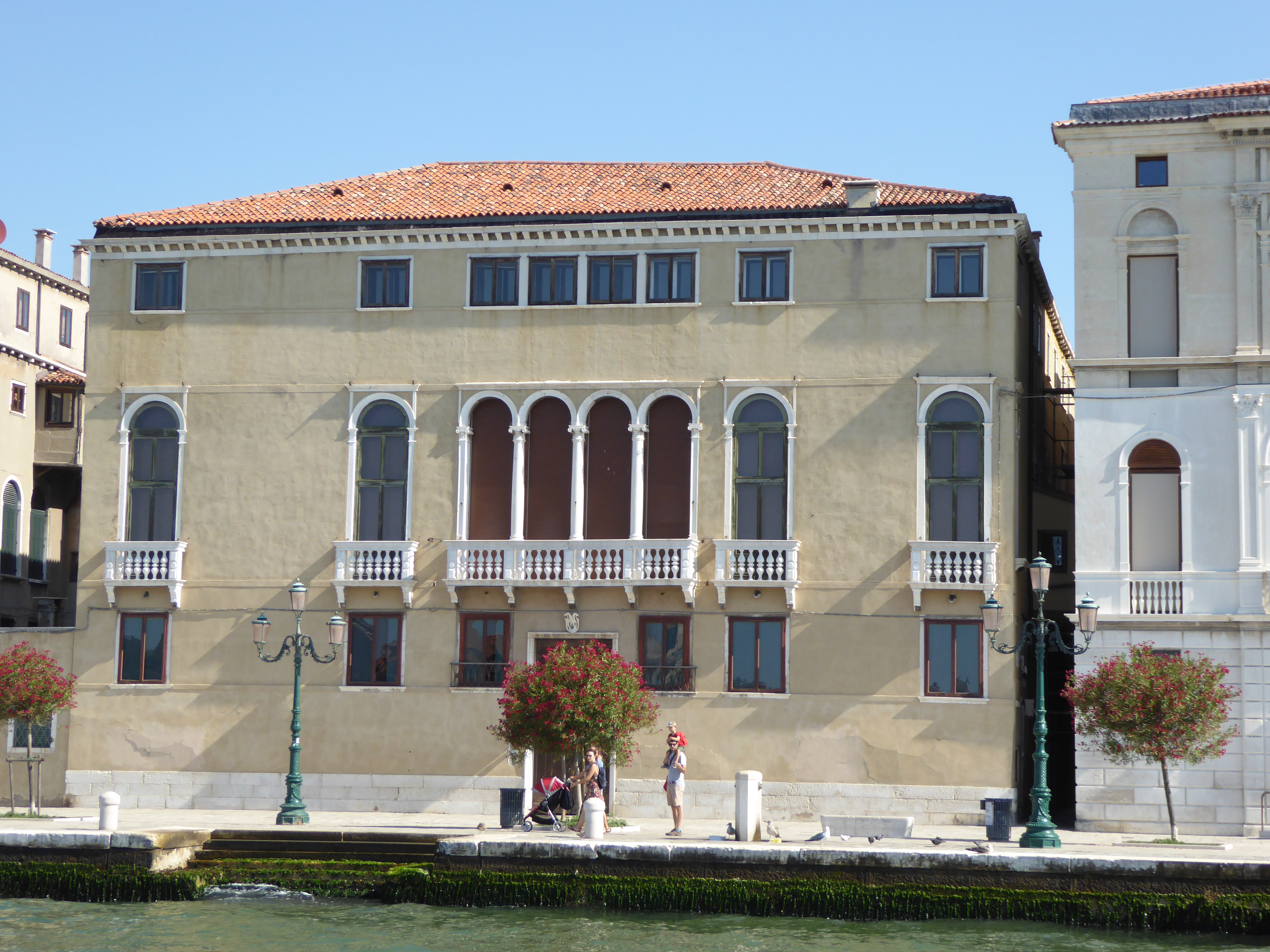
- Palazzo Giustinian Recanati
- Interactive map of the Palazzo Giustinian Recanati area

General information
- Type: Residential
- Architectural style: Renaissance
- Location: Dorsoduro district, Venice, Italy
- Coordinates: 45°25′49.52″N 12°19′26.44″E
- Construction stopped: 16th century
- Owner: Giustinian Recanati family

Technical details
- Floor count: 3

Palazzo Giustinian Recanati is a palace in Venice, Italy, located in the Dorsoduro district and overlooking the Giudecca Canal, just to the left of Palazzo Clary.

== History ==
Palazzo Giustinian was built in the 16th century for one branch of the Giustinian family, that was linked to the Morosini family by marriage. Then the palazzo passed to the Recanati, a family originally from Badia Polesine and in the 17th century ascribed to the Venetian patriciate. Currently, the building is well-preserved in all its parts and still belongs to the descendants of the Giustinian Recanati family.

== Architecture ==
The palazzo has three floors. The façade has, on the ground floor, a large portal decorated by the Giustinian stone coat of arms. The noble floor is decorated by a quadrifora flanked by pairs of monoforas. All openings on the noble floor are supported by stone balconies and inscribed in rectangular frames. The attic level, terminating with a denticulated cornice, offers a series of eight square windows.

The rear façade of the palace has neoclassical lines, due to an 18th-century intervention, probably by Antonio Diedo. This façade overlooks a small garden separated from the Rio Ognissanti by a wall, on which stands a 19th-century statue representing the Madonna and Child.

The interiors of the palace are sumptuously decorated with 18th-century stuccos and antique furnishings.

== Gallery ==
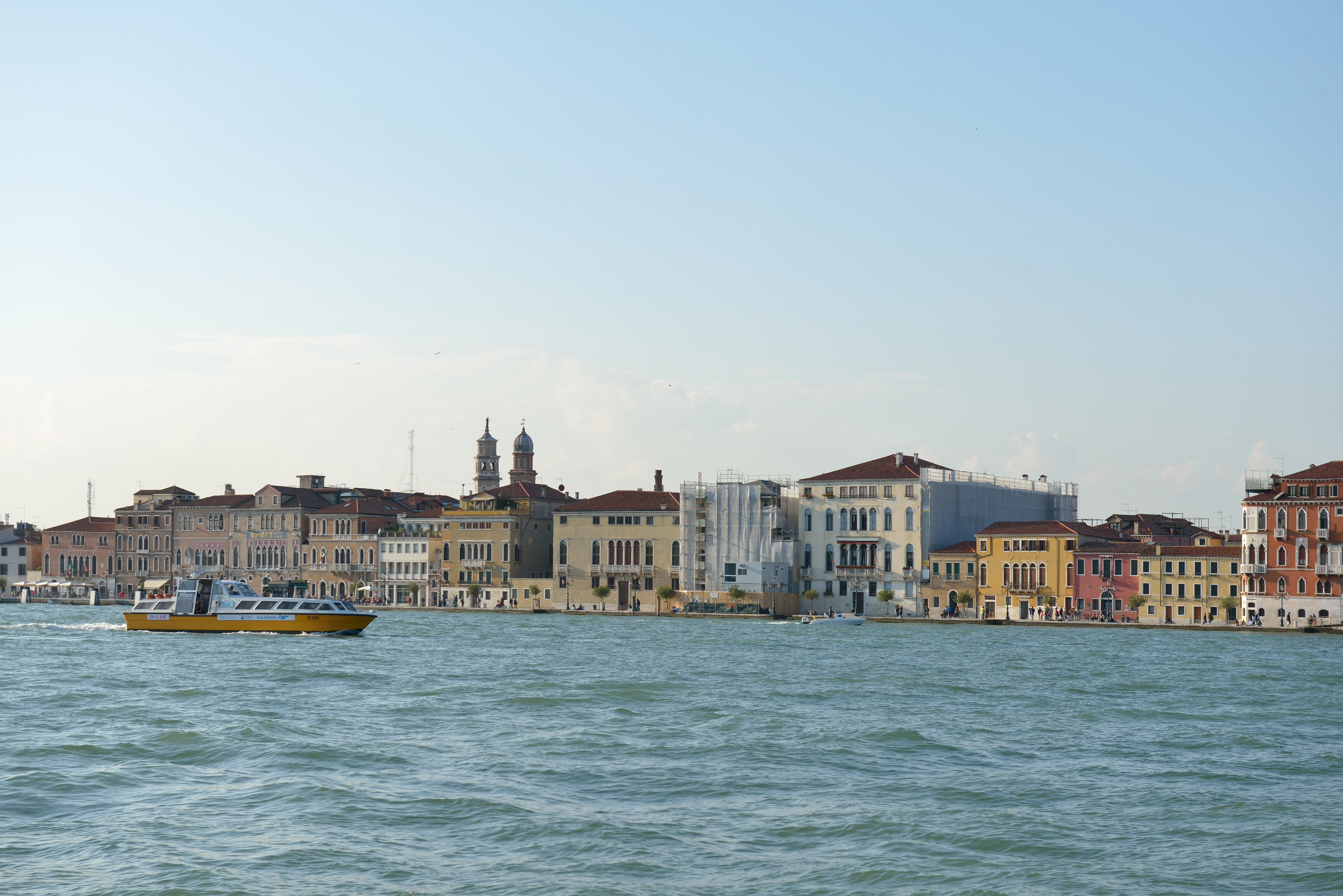
The view from the Giudecca Canal

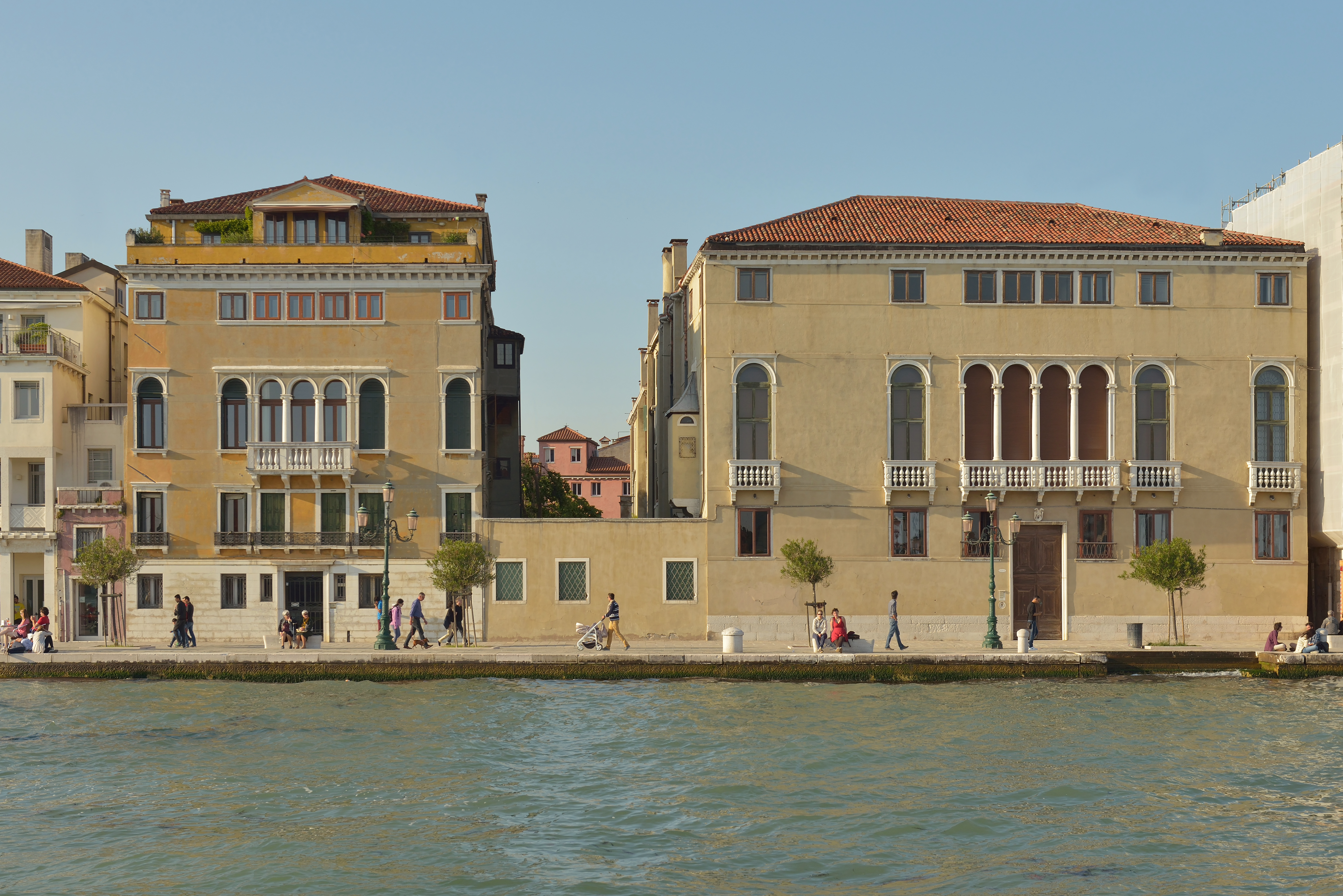
Palazzo Giustinian Recanati (right) and Ca' Lippomano (left) on Fondamenta Zattere al Ponte Lungo. View from de Giudecca Canal.

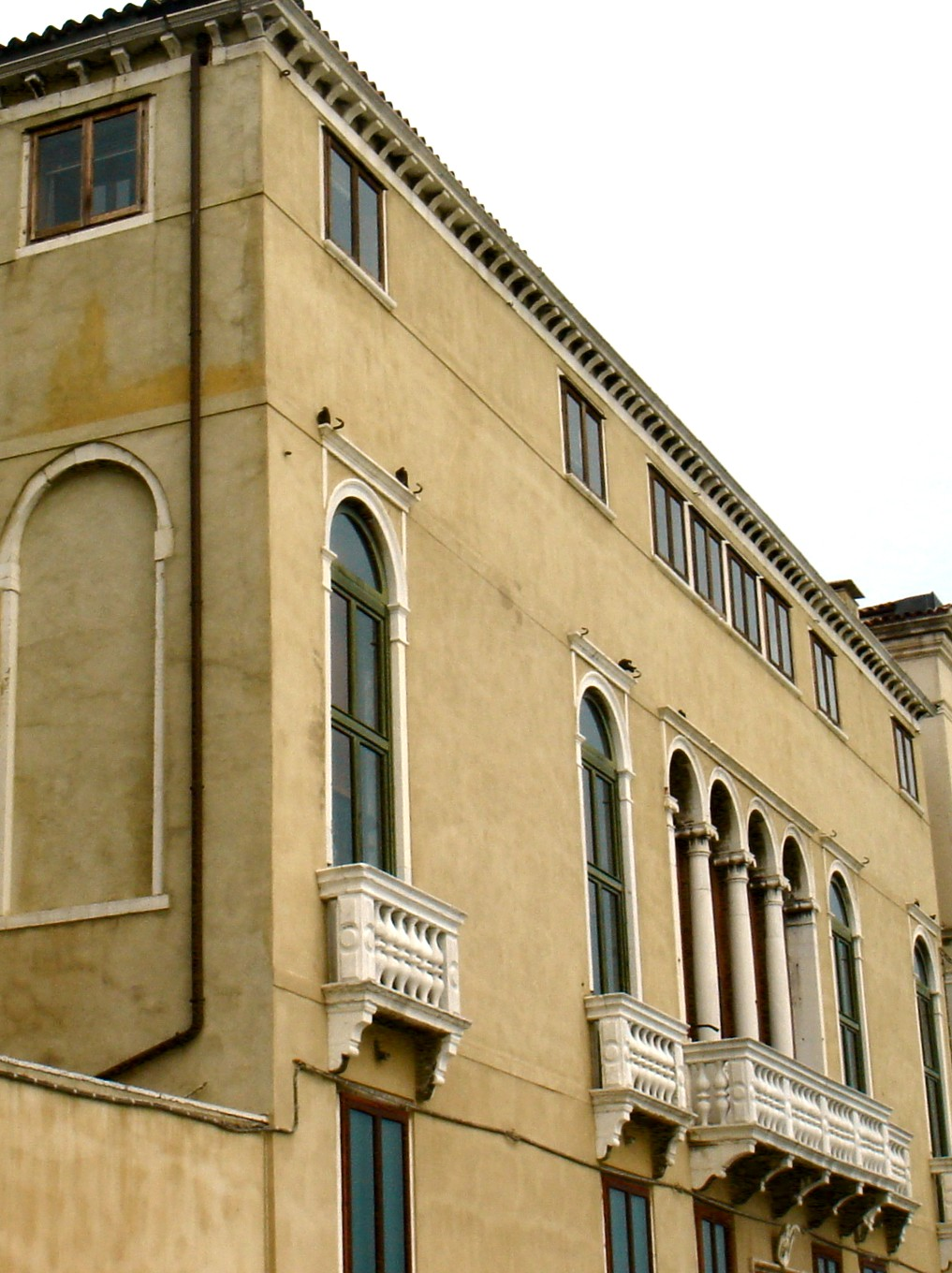
Facade details

== See also ==
- Palazzo Giustinian
- Palazzo Giustinian Pesaro
