= Francesco Bertos =

Italian sculptor

Francesco Bertos was an Italian sculptor known for his emotive and virtuosic small-scale pyramidal group sculpture. He worked primarily with bronze and produced many allegorical works. He was born and died in Dolo, a small town near Padua. Very little is known about Bertos' life. Historical records indicate his presence in Rome in 1693 and in Venice in 1710, with his activity documented until 1733 when he received a commission for two candlesticks for the basilica of Sant'Antonio (il Santo) in Padua.

Bertos' sculptures gained popularity among 18th-century Italians and tourists visiting Italy, finding their way into various collections in Europe and North America, including the Metropolitan Museum of Art in New York City. Notable examples of his work include the Allegory of Triumph, housed at the Art Institute of Chicago, and the sculpture America, displayed at the Walters Art Gallery in Baltimore. These bronze groups feature allegorical figures arranged in dynamic pyramid compositions, characterized by elongated and twisting figures in seemingly weightless poses reminiscent of Mannerist art. The nearly two meter high Carrera marble sculpture “La caduta degli angeli ribelli” (The fall of the rebel angels) located in Vicenza’s Palazzo Leoni Montanari is now identified as another of his works. https://gallerieditalia.com/it/vicenza/il-museo/

== Witchcraft accusations ==
Bertos' sculpture gained popularity for its ability to create the illusion of weightlessness despite being crafted in bronze or marble. Around 1737, he was brought before an Inquisition court and charged with witchcraft. Bertos escaped further prosecution by carving a sculpture live before his interrogators.
