= Palazzo Giustinian (Dorsoduro) =

Palace in Venice, Italy

Coordinates: 45.4345°N 12.3266°E

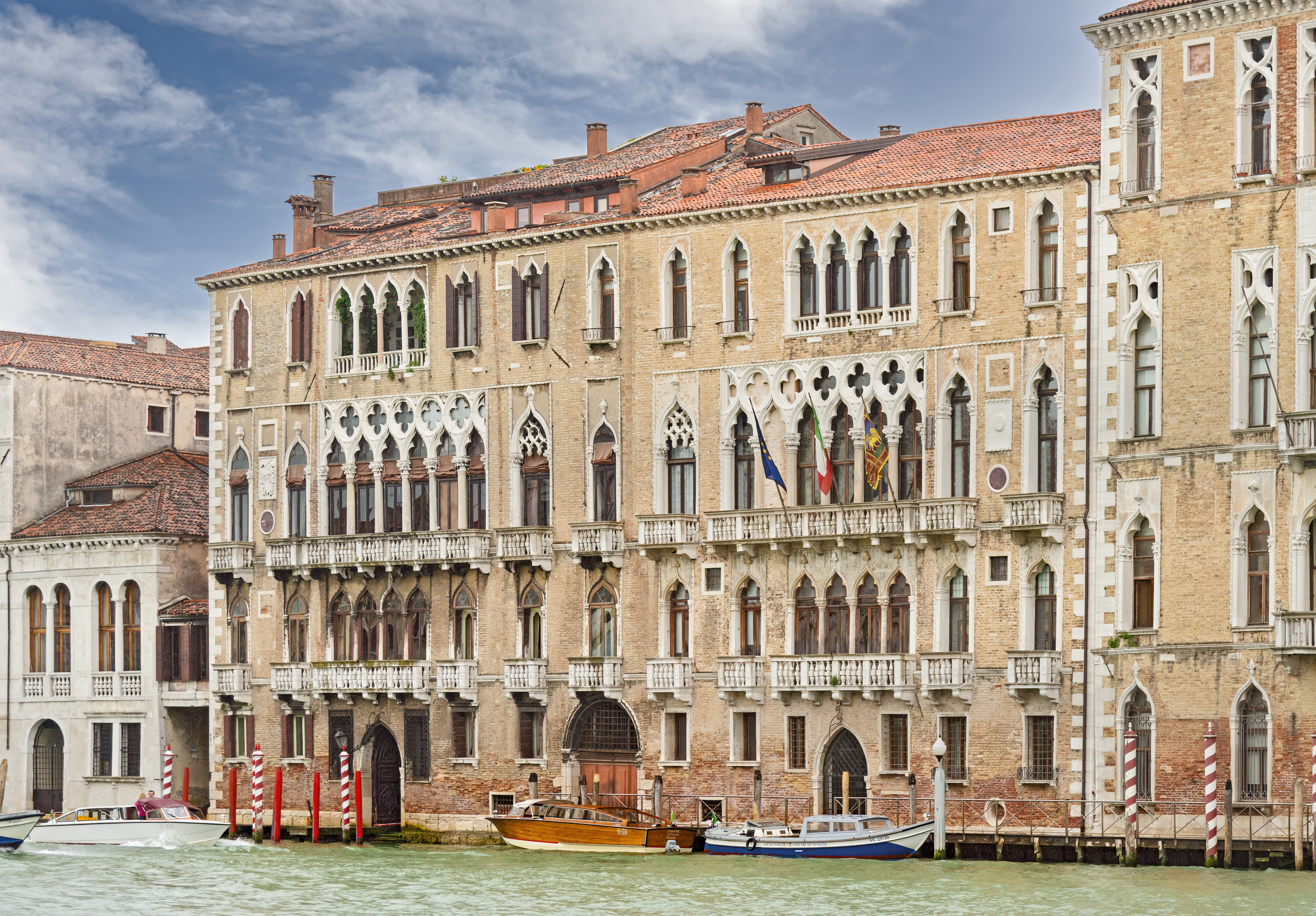
View of Palazzo Giustinian.

Palazzo Giustinian is a palace in Venice, northern Italy, situated in the Dorsoduro district and overlooking the Grand Canal next to Ca' Foscari. It is among the best examples of the late Venetian Gothic, and it was the final residence of Princess Louise of Artois.

== History ==
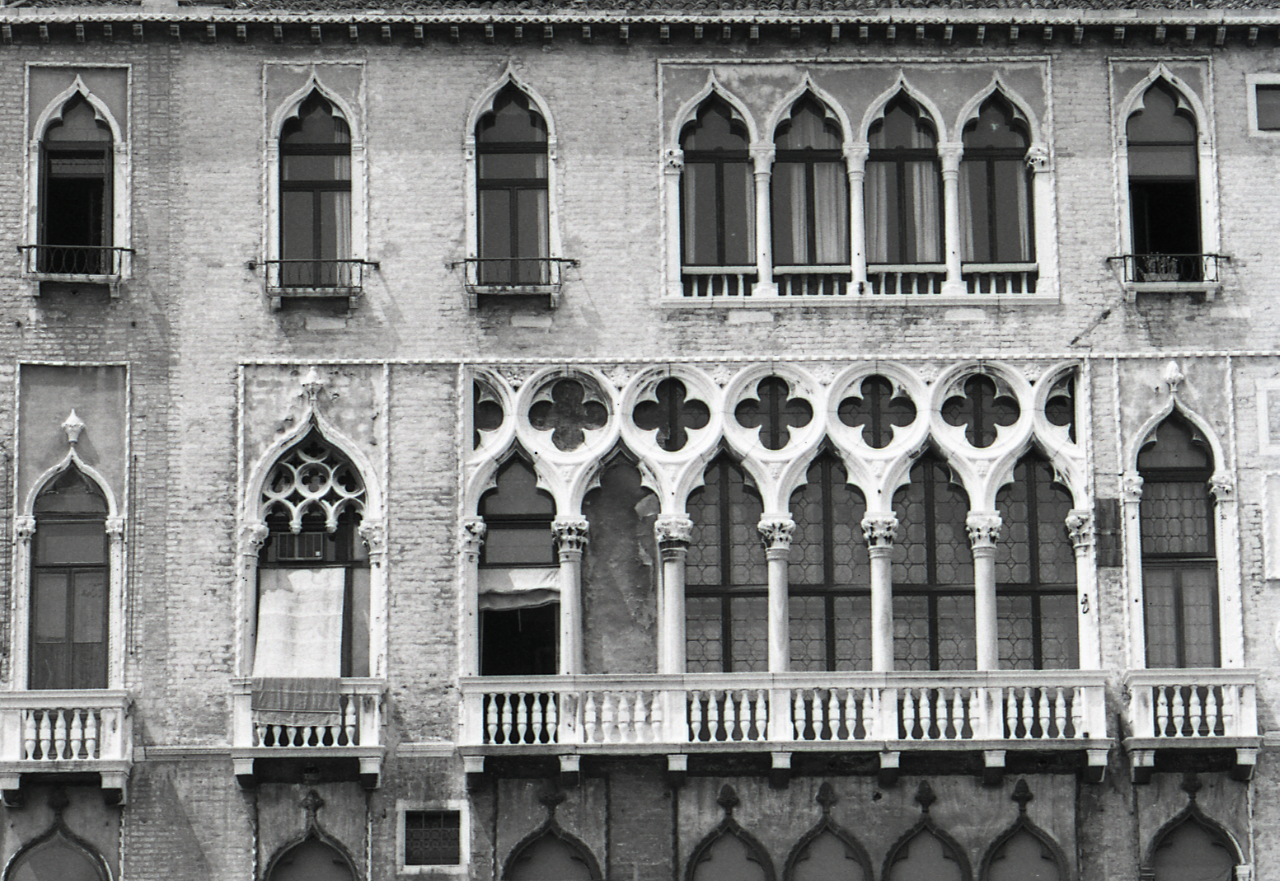
Detail of the façade. Photo by Paolo Monti, 1969.

The edifice was built in the late 15th century, perhaps with the participation of Bartolomeo Bon. The palace consisted originally of two separate sections, one for each branch of the Giustinian family, which were later joined by a façade – these are the Ca' Giustinian dei Vescovi (now housing part of the Ca' Foscari University) and the Ca' Giustinian dalle Zogie (now privately owned). Behind the façade, they are separated by an alley which, through a sottoportego (portico-tunnel), connects to the central portal.

The two sub-palaces share numerous decorative features with the annexed Ca' Foscari. They have an L-shaped plan with four floors, the upper ones having mullioned windows. At the piano nobile, they form a six-arches arcade with an interwoven motif of multi-lobes circles. The single windows are ogival, or decorated with a three-lobe motif. Ca' Giustinian dei Vescovi has in the rear a court with a Gothic staircase, while Ca' Giustinian dalle Zogie has a large garden.

== Owners and notable residents ==
The Giustinian family sold the palazzo in the 19th century. Since then, personalities such as painter Natale Schiavoni, German composer Richard Wagner (who wrote the second act of Tristan und Isolde here between 1858 and 1859), the last Duchess of Parma, Louise d'Artois, and Hungarian violinist Franz von Vecsey have lived here. George Eliot was staying there with J. W. Cross during her honeymoon in 1880.

Ca' Giustinian dei Vescovi now houses part of the Ca' Foscari University, while Ca' Giustinian dalle Zogie is privately owned by the family of Cristiana Brandolini d'Adda.

== See also ==
- Palazzo Giustinian Lolin
- Palazzo Giustinian Pesaro
- Palazzo Giustinian Recanati
