= Palazzo Giustinian Lolin =

Coordinates: 45°25′56″N 12°19′42″E

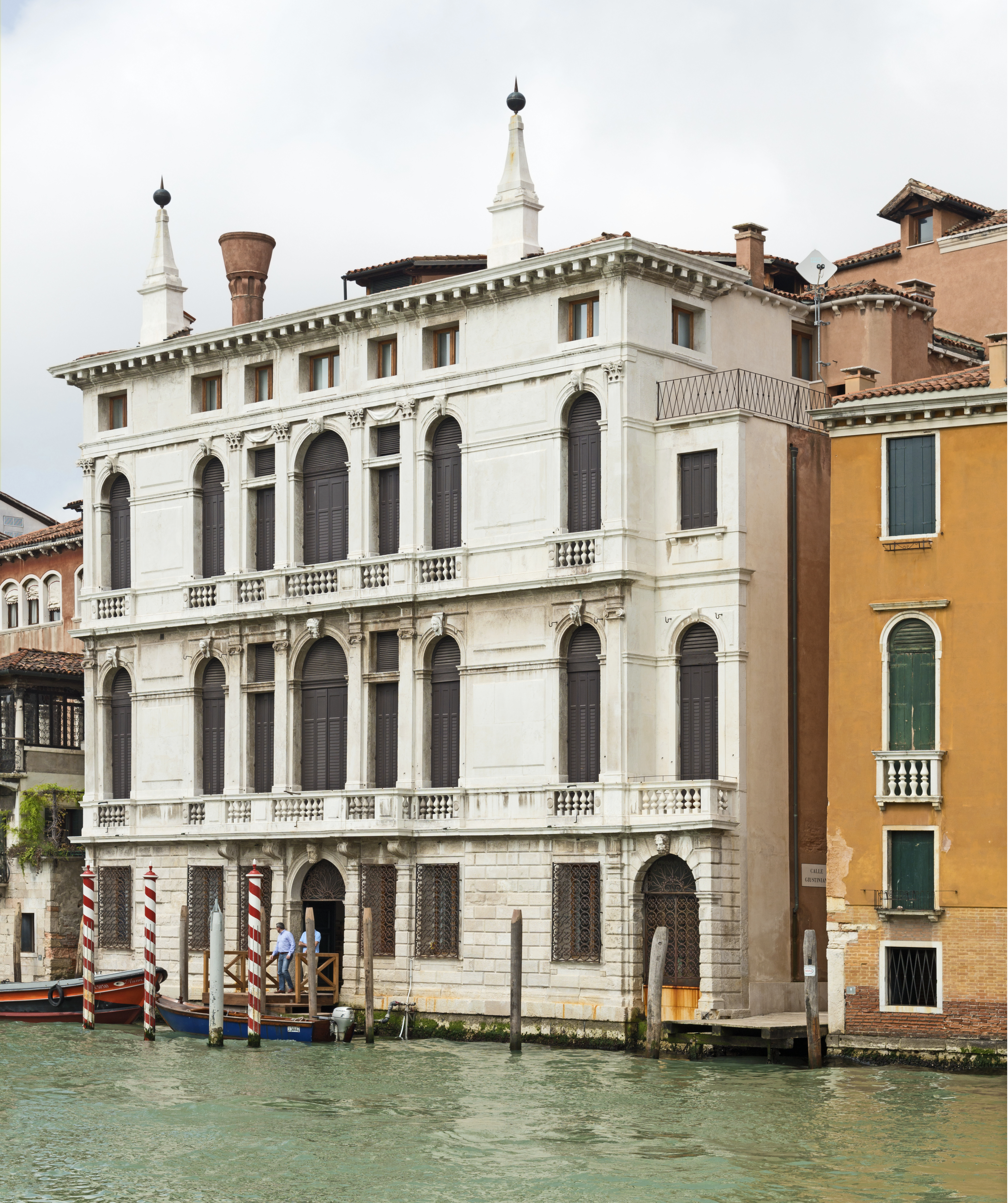

The Palazzo Giustinian Lolin is a Baroque style palace located on the Grand Canal of Venice, Italy. The present facade was designed circa 1630 by Baldassare Longhena. It is used as an exhibition venue for the Venice Biennale.

== History ==
A palace at the site was constructed in the 14th century by the Lolin family, but rebuilt in the 17th century by the Giustianian family with designs of Baldassare Longhena. Longhena's design still maintains traces of the original gothic plan, with narrow peaked windows. His facade stacks the three classical orders: Doric, Ionic, and Corinthian. In the 19th century, the palace had varied residents. In 1836, the doctor Francesco Aglietti died here. Later in the 19th century, it was owned by the dancer Maria Taglioni, and by the former Duchess of Parma, Maria Luisa.

In the 20th century, it was the home of the Ugo and Olga Levi Foundation for Music Studies, founded in 1962. The Levis were a wealthy jewish mercantile and banking family of Venice. The couple was able to survive persecution during the war, hiding as farmers in the countryside. Currently, it also houses the University of Warwick's Venice Centre which hosts teaching, research, and conference activities.

== See also ==
- Palazzo Giustinian
- Palazzo Giustinian Pesaro
