= Alan H. Kempner =

American book collector and philanthropist (1897–1985)

Alan Horace Kempner
- Born: July 4, 1897; Little Rock, Arkansas, United States
- Died: December 17, 1985 (aged 88); Manhattan, New York
- Education: B.A. Columbia College
- Occupations: stockbroker, publishing executive
- Employer: Farrar, Straus, and Giroux
- Spouse: Margaret Loeb
- Relatives: Carl M. Loeb (father-in-law); John Langeloth Loeb Sr. (brother-in-law); S. Marshall Kempner (brother-in-law); John Langeloth Loeb Jr. (nephew); Nan Kempner (daughter-in-law)

Alan Horace Kempner (July 4, 1897 – December 17, 1985) was an American stockbroker, publishing executive, rare books and manuscripts collector, and philanthropist.

== Early life and education ==
Kempner was born in Little Rock, Arkansas, before attending Columbia College, where he majored in Latin and graduated in 1917.

== Career ==
Kempner worked at the American Zinc and Chemical Company for nine years, then purchased a seat on the New York Stock Exchange and became a partner in Byfield & Company. He served as a lieutenant in World War I and joined the United States Air Corps in World War II and achieved the rank of lieutenant colonel. His interest in books led him to join Farrar, Straus and Giroux as a manager and served on its board of directors after retirement.

== Philanthropy ==
An avid book collector, Kempner held first edition books as well as manuscripts by Giambattista Bodoni, Giovanni Battista Piranesi, J. M. W. Turner, Agostino Giustiniani, and William Morris. His bookplate was designed by Rockwell Kent. Over the years, he donated his manuscripts collection to Columbia University and the Rare Book & Manuscript Library renamed the exhibition hall in his honor. He also endowed a professorship of biological sciences at Columbia, which was first held by noted biologist James E. Darnell.

He also served as the president and chairman of the Hospital for Joint Diseases.

== Personal life ==
Kempner married Margaret Loeb, the daughter of investment banker and founder of Loeb, Rhoades & Co., Carl M. Loeb, on June 1, 1920. The couple had three children: Alan Horace Kempner Jr., Carl Loeb Kempner, and Thomas Lenox Kempner, who married socialite and fashion icon Nan Kempner. His descendants bearing the Kempner name are still in charge of the successors to the Loeb, Rhoades & Co. investment firm and the Loeb family fortune. His grandson, Thomas Lenox Kempner Jr., co-founded the hedge fund Davidson Kempner Capital Management.

His sister, Charlotte Kempner, married investment banker and founder of the Bank of the West, Sigmund Marshall Kempner, after he was divorced from Barbara Hazel Guggenheim, the daughter of Benjamin Guggenheim and sister of Peggy Guggenheim.
