= Thomas L. Kempner Jr. =

American investor and philanthropist

Thomas Lenox Kempner Jr.
- Born: March 23, 1953 (age 73); Southampton, New York
- Education: B.A. Yale; Harvard Business School
- Occupation: Investor
- Spouse: Katheryn Clews Patterson (1978-Present)
- Parent(s): Nan Kempner; Thomas Lenox Kempner
- Relatives: Alan H. Kempner (grandfather); Carl M. Loeb (great grandfather); S. Marshall Kempner (great uncle)

Thomas Lenox Kempner Jr. (born March 23, 1953) is an American investor and philanthropist and a co-founder of Davidson Kempner Capital Management.

== Early life ==
Kempner was born on March 23, 1953, in Southampton, New York. He is the son of investment banker Thomas Lenox Kempner and New York socialite Nan Field Schlesinger (better known as Nan Kempner), who was the U.S. correspondent for Vogue France. Among his siblings was younger brother James Lindsay Kempner.

His paternal grandparents were Alan H. Kempner and Margaret (née Loeb) Kempner (the daughter of Carl M. Loeb, investment banker and founder of Loeb, Rhoades & Co.). His maternal grandfather was Albert Edward Schlesinger of San Francisco, founder and former chairman of S & C Motors, one of California's largest Ford dealerships.

Kempner graduated from Yale College in 1975 with a major in computer science. He later graduated from Harvard Business School in 1978.

== Career ==
Following Harvard, he worked for Goldman Sachs & Company, investment bankers from 1978 to 1981. He later worked in principal investments at two small firms, Loeb Partners and First City Capital. In 1984, he co-founded Davidson Kempner Capital Management, a global institutional investment management firm originally founded in May 1983 by Marvin H. Davidson as M.H. Davidson & Co. Kempner became Executive Managing Member in January 2004 and retired from the firm in December 2019. He was succeeded by Tony Yoseloff.

In 2020, he founded and began serving as president of Keewaydin Investments LLC.

=== Philanthropy ===
In 1987, Kempner established the Thomas L. Kempner Jr. Foundation which supports "organizations working in the fields of education, the environment, and the performing arts." Following his retirement, Kempner began serving on the Board of Trustees of the Ford Foundation. With his father, he endowed a chair in computer sciences in the Yale School of Engineering & Applied Sciences.

He serves as chairman of the board of the Central Park Conservancy and of St. Bernard's School in New York City and serves on the boards of Harlem Village Academies, Harvard Management Company, and the Mount Sinai Health System.

== Personal life ==
In July 1978, he became engaged to Harvard Law School graduate Katheryn Clews Patterson, a daughter of Herbert Parsons Patterson, former president of the Chase Manhattan Bank and grandson of Rufus L. Patterson Jr., and Louise Oakey Patterson, an operatic and concert soprano. They married at St. Andrew's Dune Church in Southampton, New York in May 1979.
