= Nan Kempner =

American socialite (1930–2005)

- Born: Nan Field Schlesinger; July 24, 1930; San Francisco, California, U.S.
- Died: July 3, 2005 (age 74); New York City, U.S.
- Education: Connecticut College (BA)
- Spouse: Thomas Lenox Kempner
- Children: 3, including Thomas L. Kempner Jr.
- Relatives: Carl M. Loeb (grandfather-in-law); Alan H. Kempner (father-in-law)

Nan Kempner (July 24, 1930 – July 3, 2005) was a New York City socialite, known for her fashion sense, her philanthropy, and as "The Queen of Everything".

== Biography ==
Born Nan Field Schlesinger in San Francisco, Kempner was the only child of Albert "Speed" Schlesinger, who owned S&C Auto, the largest car dealership in California, and the socialite Irma Schlesinger. Albert reportedly told his daughter, "You'll never make it on your face, so you'd better be interesting." Kempner attended the Hamlin School and started collecting couture clothing as a teen-ager. Following her mother's example, she started smoking at age 14 and, at her mother's urging, developed methods of staying slim, including making sandwiches using thick slices of lettuce, rather than slices of bread.

Kempner attended Connecticut College for Women and spent her junior year abroad studying at The Sorbonne, where she also took art lessons from Fernand Léger. Upon her return to New York, she met Thomas Lenox Kempner, the son of publisher Alan H. Kempner and grandson of the businessman Carl M. Loeb. They married in 1952 and had three children. After living in London for a short time, the Kempners settled in New York. Thomas founded the investment company Loeb Partners, while Nan became a leader in high society. She was known for being the "social X-ray," a term coined by Tom Wolfe in his novel The Bonfire of the Vanities, and for her friendships with members of the American power elite, particularly Nancy Reagan.

Kempner, who missed only one runway season in 55 years, was widely considered among the most highly informed authorities in fashion. Over the course of her life, she owned one of the largest private couture collections in the country, a collection which preserved some of the most important pieces of mid-20th century couture. She worked, variously, as a contributing editor for French Vogue, as a fashion editor for Harper's Bazaar, as a design consultant for Tiffany & Co., and as an international representative of the auction house Christie's.

=== Charity Work ===
Over 30 years, she helped raise more than $75,000,000 for the Memorial Sloan-Kettering Cancer Center. The proceeds for her 2000 book, R.S.V.P.: Menus for Entertaining from People Who Really Know How, were donated to Memorial Sloan-Kettering.

== Death and legacy ==
Kempner died on July 3, 2005, aged 74, of emphysema. She was survived by her husband and three children: Lina Kempner, Thomas Kempner Jr., and James Kempner. Two months after her death, her family held a memorial service at Christie's; 500 guests attended.

In December 2006, the Metropolitan Museum of Art's Costume Institute exhibited Nan Kempner: American Chic, selections from Kempner's couture collection. In 2007, the exhibition was displayed at San Francisco's De Young Museum. Much of the collection went to the Fine Arts Museums of San Francisco.

== In popular culture ==
- In 1973, Kempner was painted by Andy Warhol.
- In Armistead Maupin's Tales of the City, two society matrons discuss the creation of a society wax museum, concerned that future generations might not otherwise know what Nan Kempner looked like.
- Diana Vreeland, former editor of Vogue: "There are no chic women in America. The one exception is Nan Kempner."
- Valentino said, "Nan always looks so wonderful in my clothes, because she had a body like a hanger."
- Kempner famously defied the dress code at La Côte Basque, which declined to seat women wearing pants, by removing her trousers and covering herself with napkins.

== Sources ==
- How to Be a Park Avenue Princess
