= Armand G. Erpf =

American investment banker and art collector (1897–1971)

- Born: Armand Grover Erpf; December 8, 1897; New York City, US
- Died: February 2, 1971 (aged 73); New York City, US
- Education: Columbia University (BA)
- Occupations: investment banker, art collector
- Known for: senior partner of Loeb, Rhoades & Co., chairman of the Executive Committee of Crowell-Collier Publishing Company, financier of the New York magazine
- Spouse: Susan Stuart Mortimer
- Children: 2

Armand Grover Erpf (December 8, 1897 – February 2, 1971) was an American investment banker, philanthropist, and art collector. He was a senior partner at Loeb, Rhoades & Co., chairman of the Executive Committee of the Crowell-Collier Publishing Company, and helped finance the New York magazine.

== Early life and education ==
Erpf was born in New York City to Bartholomew Erpf and Cornelia von Greiner on December 8, 1897. He graduated from Columbia College with a Bachelor of Science degree in 1917.

== Career ==
Erpf began his career as assistant secretary for the Suffern Company, a company that imports manganese ore. In 1919, he became an officer and part owner in 1919 of C. E. Erpf & Co. crude rubber brokers.

He went to Germany in 1923 to conduct a survey of textile enterprises in Saxony, and in 1924 he joined a management engineering firm as statistician.

In 1933, Erpf joined Loeb, Rhoades & Co. and became general partner in 1936.

From 1942 to 1946, Erpf was in the United States Army, entering with the rank of lieutenant colonel and was promoted to colonel. He was with the General Staff Corps and later in the Western Pacific. He was awarded Legion of Merit.

In 1956, Erpf invested in the Crowell-Collier Publishing Company after it ceased publication of Collier's magazine. Under his financial guidance, Crowell-Collier went from the verge of bankruptcy to making a $4 million profit in five years' time. Erpf encouraged the company to use its profits from the sales of Collier's Encyclopedia to purchase Macmillan Inc. in 1960, Brentano's bookstores, Berlitz School of Languages, and Berlitz Publications in quick procession, turning it into one of the nation's largest publishers.

Beginning in 1959, Erpf was the head of Columbia Associates, an alumni and benefactor organization for Columbia University. In this capacity, Erpf played a significant role in the creation and financing of the Columbia Lectures in International Studies, an educational television series that began in 1962 on Metropolitan Broadcasting Corporation stations.

With the demise of the New York World Journal Tribune in 1967, the predecessor of the New York magazine fell into financial hardships. Erpf stepped in with financial assistance and helped Clay Felker resume the publication. Felker credited him as the "financial architect" of the magazine.

Erpf also sat on the board of the Whitney Museum and Lincoln Center. On his 70th birthday in 1967, he with honored by John L. Loeb and several of his close associates with a $500,000 named chair at Columbia Business School.

For his interest in the arts and letters combined with a successful business career, Time magazine called him "Wall Street's closest approximation of Renaissance man" in 1962. However, he was also known for his secrecy and refrained from interviews.

== Art collection ==
Erpf collected contemporary artworks. He once commissioned the British sculptor and writer Michael Ayrton to build a maze on his Upstate New York estate upon reading his book The Maze Maker. In 1968, a gigantic maze consisting of 1680 feet of stone pathways and brick walls eight feet high at two hundred feet in diameter was built, with a seven-foot bronze Minotaur and a seven-foot bronze of Daedelus and Icarus in two central chambers. According to Christie's, it was the largest labyrinth built since classical antiquity.

His art collections were donated to the Whitney Museum of American Art and the Metropolitan Museum of Art after his death.

== Personal life ==
Erpf was married twice. His first marriage in 1928 ended in divorce, and his second marriage was to Susan Stuart Mortimer, a New York artist, in 1965. The couple had two children, Armand Bartholomew (Tolomy) and Cornelia Aurelia Erpf. His son, Tolomy Erpf, is a hedge fund manager and owns the Oceanus villa with his sister Cornelia on Mustique, where British Prime Minister Boris Johnson spent his New Year holiday with his then-partner, Carrie Symonds, in 2020.

He died of a heart attack on February 2, 1971, while working in his office at 42 Wall Street, leaving an estate worth $8 million. He lived at 820 Fifth Avenue and on a 500-acre estate in Arkville, New York.
