= Columbia Associates =

Columbia Associates was a group of alumni and other benefactors of Columbia University who committed to making periodic donations to the university and helped direct actions of the university that would do good for the greater community. It was formed in 1949, during the time that Dwight D. Eisenhower was the president of Columbia, and existed into at least the mid-1960s.

By the late 1940s, Columbia's financial position was somewhat precarious, and in 1948 the university drew up a 'development program' to raise some $200 million over the next six years. Paul H. Davis, in charge of fundraising initiatives at Columbia, formed Columbia Associates in 1949 with the goal of recruiting alumni and friends to get the development program underway; over the next couple of years it did this, sometimes with Eisenhower urging benefactors to join. Members of Columbia Associates were expected to donate $1,000 annually to the university and were given the chance to advise the university regarding the course of the development program. Eisenhower had an image for Columbia Associates in which "men of circumstance" were given a "position of honor and respect in University life"; one such person that he tried to recruit, albeit unsuccessfully, was John D. Rockefeller Jr. Eisenhower's favorite project during this time, The American Assembly, was officially announced at a luncheon of the Columbia Associates, and the associates were employed in fundraising efforts for it.

The first head of Columbia Associates was James DeCamp Wise, an alumnus and businessman. He was succeeded in 1952 by Peter Grimm, an alumnus and real estate executive; in 1956 by Roscoe C. Ingalls, an alumnus and financier; and in 1959 by Armand G. Erpf, an alumnus and investment banking partner at Loeb, Rhoades & Co.

In 1952, Columbia Associates was described as "a group of alumni and friends of the university interested in promoting community welfare." By 1959, this mission was being stated as "seek[ing], through counsel and cooperative effort, to contribute to the social and educational good of the community through Columbia University." Erpf and Columbia Associates played a significant role in the financing and creation of the Columbia Lectures in International Studies, an educational television series that began in 1962 on Metropolitan Broadcasting Corporation stations.

Columbia Associates was still active as of 1965. What became of it after that is unclear, although it may have lasted into the 1970s.
