= Columbia Lectures in International Studies =

Educational television series of the 1960s

- Genre: Educational
- Created by: Armand G. Erpf
- Developed by: William A. Wood
- Presented by: Faculty of Columbia University
- Country of origin: United States
- Original language: English
- No. of seasons: 2 or 3
- No. of episodes: perhaps 300

Production
- Producer: Paul Noble
- Production location: New York City
- Camera setup: Multi-camera
- Running time: 30 minutes
- Production company: Metromedia

Original release
- Network: WNEW-TV Channel 5 and other Metromedia-owned stations
- Release: March 26, 1962 – September 18, 1964

The Columbia Lectures in International Studies, also known as the Columbia Seminars in International Studies or as just the Columbia Seminars, was an educational television series of the early 1960s. It consisted of a series of half-hour broadcasts delivered by the faculty of Columbia University and prepared in cooperation with the university's School of International Affairs and Regional Institutes, with professors from other parts of the university also sometimes taking part. The series was produced by a commercial station, WNEW-TV Channel 5 in New York, and aired in early morning time slots on that station and others owned by Metromedia.

== Origins and goals ==
The series was announced in March 1962, with the first installment airing on March 26. The impetus for the series came from Armand G. Erpf, an investment banker for Loeb, Rhoades & Co. with an interest in the arts and letters. Erpf was also head of Columbia Associates, an alumni and benefactor organization for the university. Loeb, Rhoades had previously been involved in the investment deals that led to the creation of the Metropolitan Broadcasting Corporation (known as Metromedia beginning in 1961) following the demise of the DuMont Television Network; when Erpf heard that Metromedia had a vacant half-hour in its early morning schedule, he came up with the idea of the lecture series. Columbia Associates provided the financing for the new series, which had no commercial sponsorship.

William A. Wood, a professor of journalism who was director of the university's Office of Radio–TV relations, assisted the faculty participants in the planning and production of the programs. The initial commitment was for 100 half-hour programs; this represented the university's deepest foray yet into the world of television.

Among the goals of the series was to give viewers a better understanding of the trouble spots of the world and to provide historical and political background to events in the news. Grayson L. Kirk, the president of the university, said of the series, "It is my confident hope that the programs will stimulate new thinking and new curiosity. I trust they will send members of the viewing audiences back to their books on the subjects under discussion."

"For the layman at home, the opportunity is a rich one, indeed: an extensive introduction to the intracacies of foreign affairs by outstanding experts who otherwise might not be so widely heard."

— New York Times appraisal, March 1962

Paul Noble served as the producer of the lectures for Metropolitan Broadcasting. The head of WNEW-TV, Bennet H. Korn, and his staff pointed to the Columbia Seminars as an important part of the station's cultural programming, along with symphony orchestra broadcasts and other performing arts shows; Korn said that he when looking for such programming, "I thought in terms of all New York, with love for it. I wanted serious things, beautiful things, which are hard to find and produce." In part, however, these shows served to offset criticism of WNEW-TV's prime-time schedule, which was dominated by reruns of recently concluded crime shows such as Peter Gunn, Outlaws, and Dragnet.

The Columbia Lectures came in the wake of two established early-morning educational shows, Continental Classroom on the NBC network, which emphasized science and mathematics, and Sunrise Semester on the CBS network, which covered a range of subjects. In addition, CBS had started another one in 1961, College of the Air. In New York, these shows aired in 6:00 a.m. and 6:30 a.m. time slots on WNBC-TV Channel 4 and WCBS-TV Channel 2. All three of those programs offered sequential course-length coverage of their subjects, and could be taken for college credit, although most viewers chose to watch them simply for their own enlightenment.

In contrast, the Columbia Lectures did not involve any academic credits being given. However, they were said to be the first time that any university had made its entire graduate school faculty available for presentations on television. Existence of the series drew praise from Newton Minow, chair of the Federal Communications Commission, who just the previous year had given his famous "vast wasteland" speech. The scheme for the series was one that other urban-area universities could adopt were they to be so interested.

== Stations and airings ==
In New York, the time slot for the Columbia Lectures in International Studies on Channel 5 was weekdays at 7:30 to 8:00 a.m. Its lead-in was a fifteen-minute segment in which the station came on the air and showed a call to prayer, and it was followed by Sandy Becker's popular children's show.

The second-highest profile station airing the series, in a similar early-morning time slot, was WTTG Channel 5 in Washington, D.C. The other Metropolitan Broadcasting stations broadcasting it, also generally in the early mornings, were WTVP Channel 17 in Decatur, Illinois; WTVH Channel 8 in Peoria (switched to Channel 19 during 1963), Illinois; KMBC-TV Channel 9 in Kansas City, Missouri; and KOVR Channel 13 in Sacramento, California. Subsequently, KTTV Channel 11 in Los Angeles, California, began airing the series during 1963 after that station was acquired by Metromedia.

In addition, the lectures were initially broadcast on WRUL (shortwave), giving them a potential reach to Latin America, Europe, and Africa.

The program was shown in black-and-white, using a multicamera setup. They were typically recorded by the faculty involved several days before they aired. The lectures tended to be presented simply, with a minimum of visual aids.

== The lectures ==
The first lecture aired was titled "Stresses Within the Communist Bloc" and was given by Zbigniew Brzezinski. The evening before, a special broadcast previewing the series was shown by WNEW-TV; it featured Brzezinski's lecture along with introductory remarks by Grayson L. Kirk, the president of university; John W. Kluge, the head of Metromedia; and Erpf, representing Columbia Associates. Erpf noted that the series now allowed teachers to speak before not just a class but an entire community.

Overall, the first two weeks of lectures were focused on crisis points around the world, while the two weeks of lectures after that examined the longer-term forces at play in international relations during the twentieth century.

Jack Gould, the television critic for the New York Times, said that the series was a "project of exciting magnitude and usefulness". In particular he praised Brzezinski's opening lecture for a "lucidity that consistently held the attention." He did say that the early morning time slot unfortunately prevented people from seeing the series who were commuting to work at that hour. Time magazine said that the series was "brainstretching" and represented "a breakfast-time disquisition ... of uncompromisingly erudite lectures on international affairs".

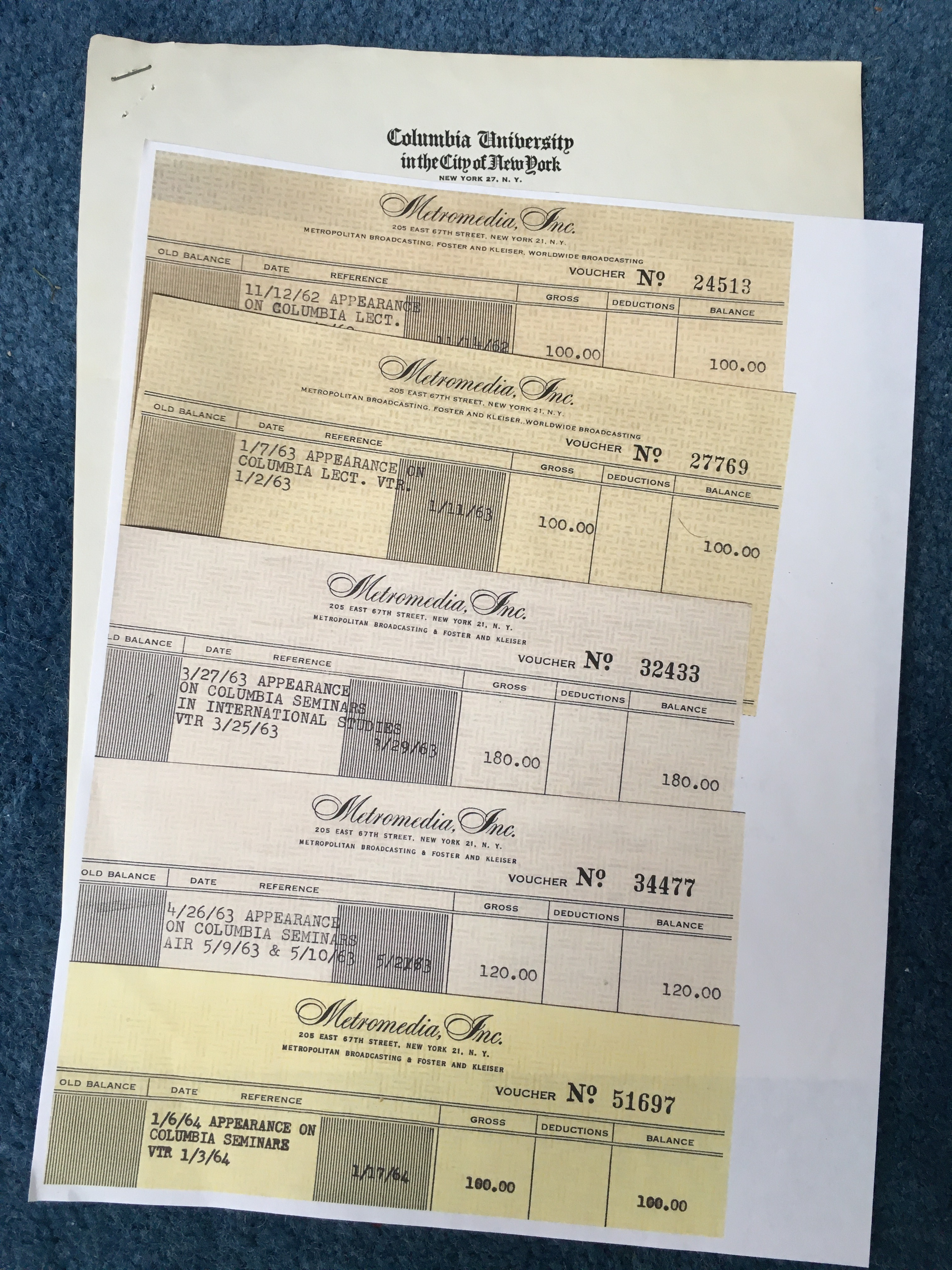
Payment slips for lectures given by a Columbia professor, November 1962–January 1964

Several of the more well-known early presenters were announced in advance; these included J. C. Hurewitz, addressing the "Crisis in Kuwait: Arab Petroleum Politics"; L. Gray Cowen on "The Politics of a Free Congo"; Margaret Mead, with the topic "Principal Culture Areas"; and Arthur F. Burns, speaking about "Communism and Capitalism as International Social Forces".

The series was deemed successful enough that a second season of the Columbia Lectures was announced in October 1962 and began on November 12, 1962. The first week of programs had the theme "The World as Seen From" the United Nations, Washington, Moscow, London, and Paris, and the lectures were given by Andrew W. Cordier, Richard E. Neustadt, Alexander Dallin, Thomas P. Peardon, and Shepard B. Clough, respectively. Indeed, "The World As Seen From <some capital city>" would be a common title of lectures throughout the program's run.

Some lectures would combine subjects and professors, for instance the topic "Russia, the United States, and China", with Alexander Dallin, Warner R. Schilling, and A. Doak Barnett, respectively, covering the foreign policy perspectives of the three countries.

A third season of the program may have begun in October 1963, with another hundred shows being produced (or there may have just been an ongoing continuation of the shows already being done). One of the first programs shown at this point was "The World As Seen From Mexico City" by emeritus professor Frank Tannenbaum.

In some cases there would be a five-part series during a week, with one professor serving as a moderator; an example was "Trends Among Three Major World Blocs", moderated by Warner R. Schilling.

== Later airings and re-airings ==
By mid-1963, WNEW-TV Channel 5 was re-airing some lectures on Sunday evenings at 11 p.m.

In July 1964, repeats of the Columbia Seminars had begun airing weekdays at 7 p.m. on educational television station WNDT Channel 13 in New York. This was a programming move that Jack Gould had hoped for in his initial review of the series, except that Channel 13 as an educational television station had not gone on the air yet at the time. So "Religion in the Technological Age", shown in February 1964 in the early morning on Channel 5, appeared in the evening in September 1964 on Channel 13. And, while Channel 5 in the morning might have a week of programs on the "Meaning of Communism", Channel 13 in the evening was reprising a series of lectures on "Africa Since Independence". The repeats were shown on other educational television stations as well; these included locations that had not seen the Metromedia broadcasts, such as 7:30 p.m. showings on WHYY-TV Channel 12 in Philadelphia.

The final broadcast of the Columbia Seminars in WNEW-TV Channel 5's 7:30 a.m. time slot took place on Friday, September 18, 1964. The following Monday saw the premiere of a different series from the university, Columbia Survey of the Arts, in which professors discussed the history of philosophy, religion, and the fine arts.

Although no new programs were being made, repeats of the Columbia lectures were sometimes broadcast over the next several years on the Metromedia stations that had originally aired them, such as during 1965 on Channel 17 in central Illinois; during 1966 on Channel 5 in Washington; and during 1967 on Channel 11 in Los Angeles.

== Books ==
Five books came out of the Columbia Lectures in International Studies. They were:

- Marvin Harris, Patterns of Race in the Americas (1964);
- Joseph Rothschild, Communist Eastern Europe (1964);
- L. Gray Cowan, The Dilemmas of African Independence (1964, substantially revised 1968);
- Wayne A. Wilcox, India, Pakistan and the Rise of China (1964); and
- James W. Morley, Japan and Korea: America's Allies in the Pacific (1965).

Each book was published by Walker and Company as part of its series The Walker Summit Library and each was composed of a Part I, "Interpretation", which consisted of essays adapted from the lectures, and a Part II, "Reference" (typically prepared with the assistance of someone else) which consisted of brief historical descriptions, biographical identifications, maps, charts, and tables relevant to the book's subject.
