= S. Marshall Kempner =

American investment banker

Sigmund Marshall Kempner
- Born: December 30, 1898; New York City, U.S.
- Died: August 1, 1987 (aged 88); San Francisco, California, U.S.
- Education: Columbia College (BA)
- Occupation: Investment banker
- Known for: Founder of Bank of the West
- Spouse(s): Barbara Hazel Guggenheim (divorced); Charlotte Kempner
- Children: 2
- Relatives: Alan H. Kempner (brother-in-law)

Sigmund Marshall Kempner (December 30, 1898 – August 1, 1987) was an American investment banker and founder of the French Bank of California, later known as Bank of the West.

== Education ==
Kempner was a native of New York City and graduated from Columbia College, Phi Beta Kappa, in 1919. He also attended Harvard Business School before entering the banking industry.

== Career ==
He was a managing executive of Heidelbach, Ickelheimer & Co. from 1920 to 1927 and a partner of the firm until 1942 along with Stern, Kempner & Company and Spencer B. Rock & Company.

He served a lieutenant colonel in the United States Army's finance department during World War II and headed the Victory Loan program for the Federal Reserve Bank in San Francisco, where he remained for the rest of his life. He was involved with Jewish causes and was the treasurer of National Refugee Service and was an executive on the American Jewish Committee in San Francisco.

Kempner later served as president and director of the Industrial Capital Corporation, an early venture capital firm that was seen as a precursor to West Coast venture capital, until 1965. He was the founder and chairman of the French Bank of California, which was merged into the Bank of the West during the 1980s. A civic leader, he was also a founder of French American International School in San Francisco. He also served on the finance chairman of governor Pat Brown's business advisory committee.

He received a John Jay Award from Columbia College in 1981 for distinguished professional achievement with fellow college alumni Armand Hammer and George Segal. He was also a Chevalier of the Legion of Honour and Order of Leopold II of Belgium.

== Personal life ==
Kempner married Barbara Hazel Guggenheim, the sister of Peggy Guggenheim and daughter of Benjamin Guggenheim of the Guggenheim family in 1921. He died on August 1, 1987, at age 88 in San Francisco, survived by his second wife, Charlotte Kempner, two daughters, and four grandchildren. His brother-in-law, Alan H. Kempner, is the son-in-law of prominent banker Carl M. Loeb, who founded Loeb, Rhoades & Co. His daughter, Charlotte Kempner Beyes, was a filmmaker who made documentaries to raise awareness of HIV/AIDS.
