= Alfred Huger Moses =

American banker

- Born: Alfred Huger Moses; 1840; Charleston, South Carolina
- Died: 1918 (age 78)
- Occupations: Banker; Investor
- Known for: President of the Sheffield Land, Iron and Coal Company; First mayor of Sheffield, Alabama
- Parent(s): Adeline and Levy Moses
- Relatives: Carl M. Loeb (son-in-law); John Langeloth Loeb Sr. (grandson)

Alfred Huger Moses (1840–1918) was an American banker and investor who founded the city of Sheffield, Alabama.

== Biography ==
Alfred Huger Moses was born to a Jewish family in 1840 in Charleston, South Carolina, the oldest son of Adeline and Levy Moses. In 1860, he graduated from the College of Charleston and moved to Montgomery, Alabama where he apprenticed in a local law office. During the Civil War, he served as the clerk of the Confederate District Court and enrolled in the civil defense volunteer militia company, Alabama Rebels. After the war, his brothers, Mordecai and Henry, also moved to Montgomery and together, they invested in the then depressed real estate market via their investment firm eventually building Montgomery's first skyscraper, the six-story Moses Building. In 1875, his brother Moredcai L. Moses, was elected as the first Jewish mayor of Montgomery and later as president of the Montgomery Gas and Electric Light Company. In 1880, coal and iron ore were found in the northern reaches of Alabama and Moses and his brothers invested in some mines near Florence, Alabama and purchased 30,000 acres across the Tennessee River and incorporated a new city named Sheffield, Alabama after the steel-producing city Sheffield, England. Moses served as the town's first mayor. He secured investors to fund the building of a blast furnace as well as railroad links between Birmingham, Mobile, and Chicago and sold stock to his investors via his Sheffield Land, Iron and Coal Company. By 1886, the first blast furnace was operating and in 1887, the Alabama and Tennessee Iron and Coal Company choose Sheffield as its headquarters and built three new blast furnaces. In 1891, the venture and the local Moses-founded bank failed after the price of pig iron plummeted and the local supply of iron was found to be inflated causing the railroads to pull out from completing the links from Sheffield to the rail network. After the Panic of 1893, the blast furnaces were closed, the city depopulated, and the Moses family moved to Saint Louis, Missouri.

In 1901, Sheffield's blast furnaces were restarted but closed in 1907; US Steel then purchased the mills but permanently closed them just prior to the Great Depression of 1929.

== Personal life ==
His daughter, Adeline Moses, married German-born Carl M. Loeb, then working for the local office of German metal trader Metallgesellschaft AG and would later serve as the president of the American Metal Company and founder of the investment firm Carl M. Loeb & Co. Moses was buried in Montgomery, Alabama.
