= Nick Loeb =

American businessman and actor (born 1975)

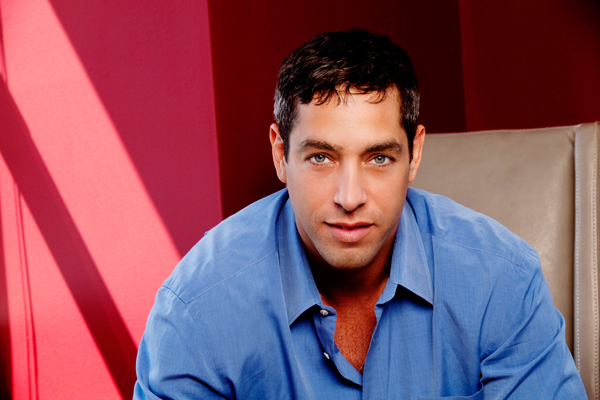
- Born: Nicholas Mears Loeb; August 2, 1975 (age 51)
- Education: Tulane University (BA)
- Spouse: Anna Pettersson (divorced)
- Partner: Sofía Vergara (2010–2014)
- Father: John Langeloth Loeb Jr.
- Relatives: Edgar Bronfman Sr. (uncle); John Langeloth Loeb Sr. (grandfather); Adele Lewisohn Lehman (great-grandmother); Carl M. Loeb (great-grandfather); Mayer Lehman (great-great-grandfather); Edgar Bronfman Jr. (cousin); Matthew Bronfman (cousin)

Nicholas Mears Loeb (born August 2, 1975) is an American businessman and actor.

== Early life and education ==
Loeb is the son of John Langeloth Loeb Jr. (1930-2026) and his second wife, Meta Martindell Harrsen. His father was Jewish and his mother an Episcopalian, the faith into which he was baptized. His father was the United States Ambassador to Denmark from 1981 to 1983 and served as a Delegate to the United Nations in 1984. He has one half-sister from his father's first marriage to Nina Sundby, Alexandra Loeb Driscoll. His parents divorced when he was one year old and he was raised by his father on the Upper East Side of New York City where he attended the Collegiate School and Loomis Chaffee School. He also spent three years in Denmark where his father was posted. In 1996, his mother killed her third husband, Jeff Bauer, and then killed herself. In 1998, Loeb graduated with a B.A. in management and finance from Tulane University.

== Career and political activities ==
After college, he worked for Mike Nichols on the film Primary Colors at his uncle's studio Universal Studios and then produced and had a featured role in a movie called The Smokers starring Dominique Swain, Thora Birch, and Busy Philipps. He was also a producer (along with Barbra Streisand) for the documentary PBS series The Living Century. He moved to Florida and worked with Lehman Brothers and later founded Carbon Solutions America, which provides climate change advisory services to corporate and government clients. Here, he claims to have helped to produce the country's first carbon neutral wine.

In 2005, Loeb lost the Delray Beach, Florida city commission race. In 2008, he served as finance co-chairman for Rudy Giuliani’s 2008 presidential run. In 2009, running as a Republican with the support of Giuliani, he abandoned a state Senate campaign because he was going through a divorce from his first wife. In 2011, Loeb decided against running for the United States Senate due to health issues stemming from severe injuries incurred in a car accident in 2010. Loeb describes himself as a "Teddy Roosevelt Republican."

In 2006 he formed Loeb's Foods and in April 2011, he founded the Crunchy Condiment Company, which sells Onion Crunch, a fried onion topping, with products being sold in over 17,000 locations.

== Personal life ==
Loeb was married to Swedish model Anna Pettersson but they later divorced. Loeb became engaged to Modern Family star, Colombian-American actress Sofía Vergara in 2012, after two years of dating. On May 23, 2014, the engagement was called off.

=== Embryo controversy ===
On April 29, 2015, The New York Times published an op-ed written by Loeb in which he argued that he should be allowed to unilaterally use the frozen embryos he created via in-vitro fertilization with Vergara, despite having previously signed an agreement stipulating that nothing could be done to the embryos without the consent of both of them, stating "Give them the right to live." Vergara's attorney has stated that Vergara wants the embryos to remain frozen. Loeb argues that the agreement – which did not expressly state what would happen to the embryos if the couple separated, a requirement under California law – should be voided. In 2016, Loeb dropped his case, though it was refiled the day after in Louisiana with the embryos as plaintiffs. In August 2017, a Louisiana Judge dismissed the case with the argument that the court had no jurisdiction over the embryos, which were conceived in California.

== Filmography ==
Year	Title	Role	Notes
2000	The Smokers	Jeremy	Also producer
2015	All Mistakes Buried	Nick	
2015	Extraction	Vinn	
2016	Precious Cargo	Andrew Herzberg	
2016	Swing State	Peter Dennon	
2017	Day of the Dead: Bloodline	Derek	
2018	Den of Thieves	Rudd	
2019	The Brawler	Donnie Wepner	
2020	Roe v. Wade	Bernard Nathanson	Also co-director, co-producer and co-writer with Cathy Allen
