= Ben Cunningham =

Ben Cunningham may refer to:

- Ben Cunningham (activist) (born 1947), American investor and anti-tax activist
- Ben Cunningham (artist) (1904–1975), American artist
- Ben Cunningham (Australian footballer) (born 1981), Australian rules footballer
- Ben Cunningham (hurler), Irish hurler
- Benny Cunningham (born 1990), American football running back
- Bennie Cunningham (1954–2018), American football tight end
- Benjamin Cunningham (1874–1946), American lawyer
