= Sheffield, Alabama =

City in Alabama, United States

- City
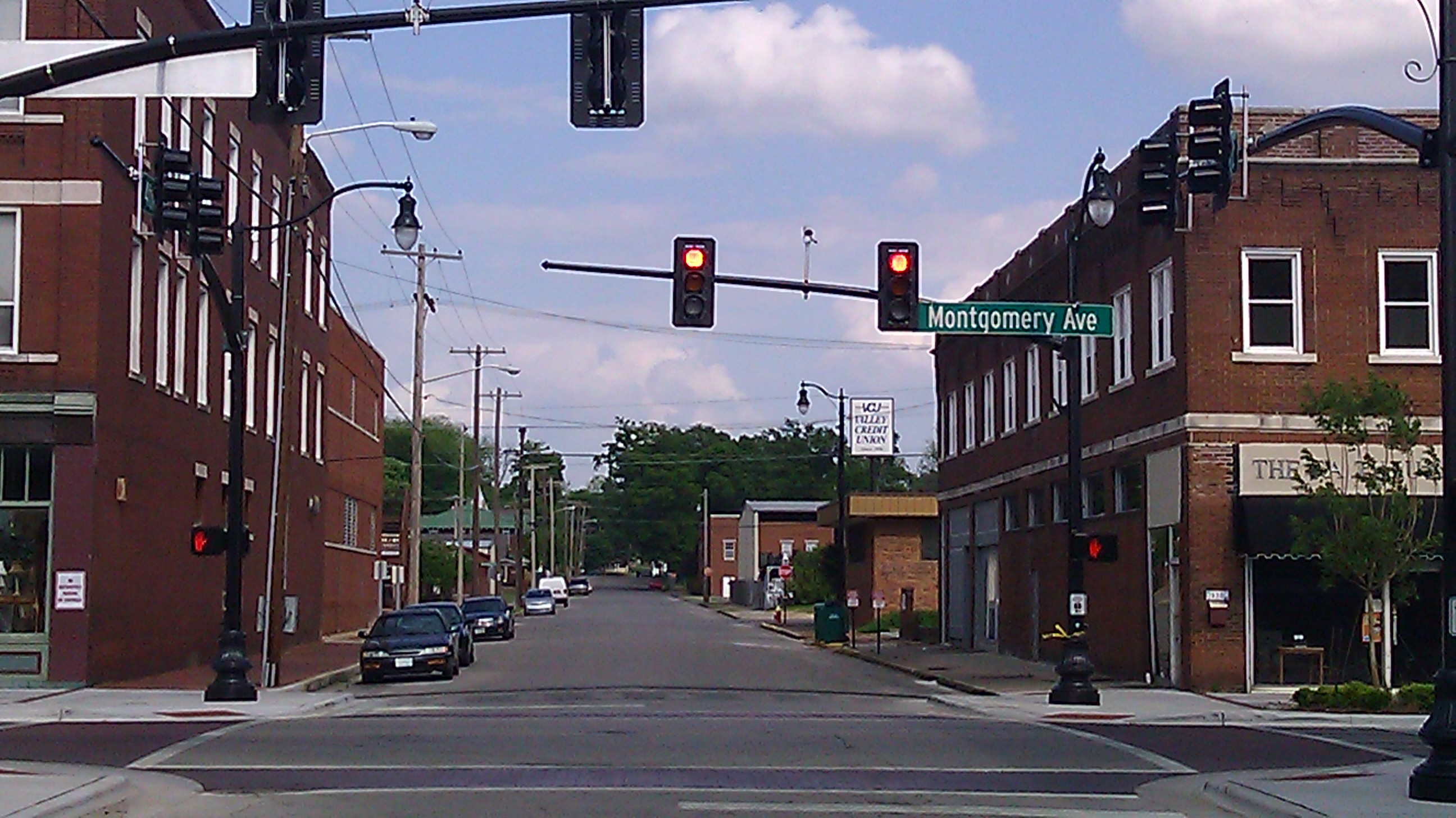
- Sheffield Downtown Commercial Historic District
- Nicknames: "Center of the Shoals"
- Location of Sheffield, Alabama
- Coordinates: 34°45′25.27″N 87°41′51.73″W
- Country: United States
- State: Alabama
- County: Colbert
- Founded: 1885
- Incorporated: February 17, 1885
- Founder: Alfred Huger Moses
- Named for: Sheffield, Yorkshire, England

Government
  - Type: Mayor–Council
  - Mayor: Bryan R. Van Devender
  - Councilmembers: William 'Hart' Gargis; John Webb; Ethan Stokes; Constance Finch; Carol Cooney

Area
  - City: 7.108 sq mi (18.410 km^{2})
  - Land: 6.989 sq mi (18.102 km^{2})
  - Water: 0.119 sq mi (0.308 km^{2})
- Elevation: 486 ft (148 m)

Population (2020)
  - City: 9,403
  - Estimate (2023): 9,307
  - Density: 1,332/sq mi (514.2/km^{2})
  - Urban: 78,925
  - Metro: 155,175
- Time zone: UTC−6 (Central (CST))
  - Summer (DST): UTC−5 (CDT)
- ZIP Code: 35660
- Area codes: 256 and 938
- FIPS code: 01-69648
- GNIS feature ID: 2405452
- Sales tax: 9.5%
- Website: sheffieldalabama.net

Sheffield is a city in Colbert County, Alabama, United States, and is included in the Florence-Muscle Shoals Metropolitan Area. The population was 9,403 at the 2020 census, and was estimated to be 9,307 in 2023.

== History ==
Sheffield is the site of historic Helen Keller Hospital, formerly known as Colbert County Hospital, originally constructed in 1921. It was changed to Helen Keller Hospital in 1979, and Keller's birthplace Ivy Green is located less than one mile southwest of the hospital in adjacent Tuscumbia.

Sheffield is the birthplace of "country-soul pioneer" and songwriter Arthur Alexander, French horn player Willie Ruff, notable attorney, actor, former senator and presidential contender Fred Thompson, Watergate committee U.S. Senator Howell Heflin and U.S. Senator Mitch McConnell, whose father was working in nearby Athens when he was born. It sometimes is referred to as "the City of Senators" due to the births of Heflin, McConnell and Thompson within its borders. Col. Harland Sanders worked for Southern Railway in Sheffield in 1907. It is also home to the Muscle Shoals Sound Studio where many popular 20th century musicians recorded their work, including Alexander and Ruff.

== Geography ==
Sheffield is located in eastern Colbert County at 34°45′25.27″N 87°41′51.73″W (34.7570187, -87.6977027). on the south bank of the Tennessee River. Sheffield is bordered to the south by the city of Tuscumbia, to the southeast by Muscle Shoals, and to the north, across the river, by Florence.

According to the United States Census Bureau, the city has a total area of 7.108 square miles (18.41 km^{2}), of which, 6.989 square miles (18.10 km^{2}) is land and 0.119 square miles (0.31 km^{2}) (1.39%) is water.

Sheffield was one of the Colbert County sites of embarkation by riverboat and barge on the Tennessee River during the forced relocation of Eastern and Southern United States Indian tribes, known as the Trail of Tears. The embarkation site was at what is now the Spring Creek boat launch and park area.

Sheffield is also home to the oldest bridge site in the state of Alabama. What is today known as the "Old Railroad Bridge," is actually a bridge site that dates back to the early 1800s.

== Economy ==
In 1940, the Reynolds Metals Company set up its first aluminum smelting facility in Sheffield, paving the way for wartime expansion of aircraft production in the country.

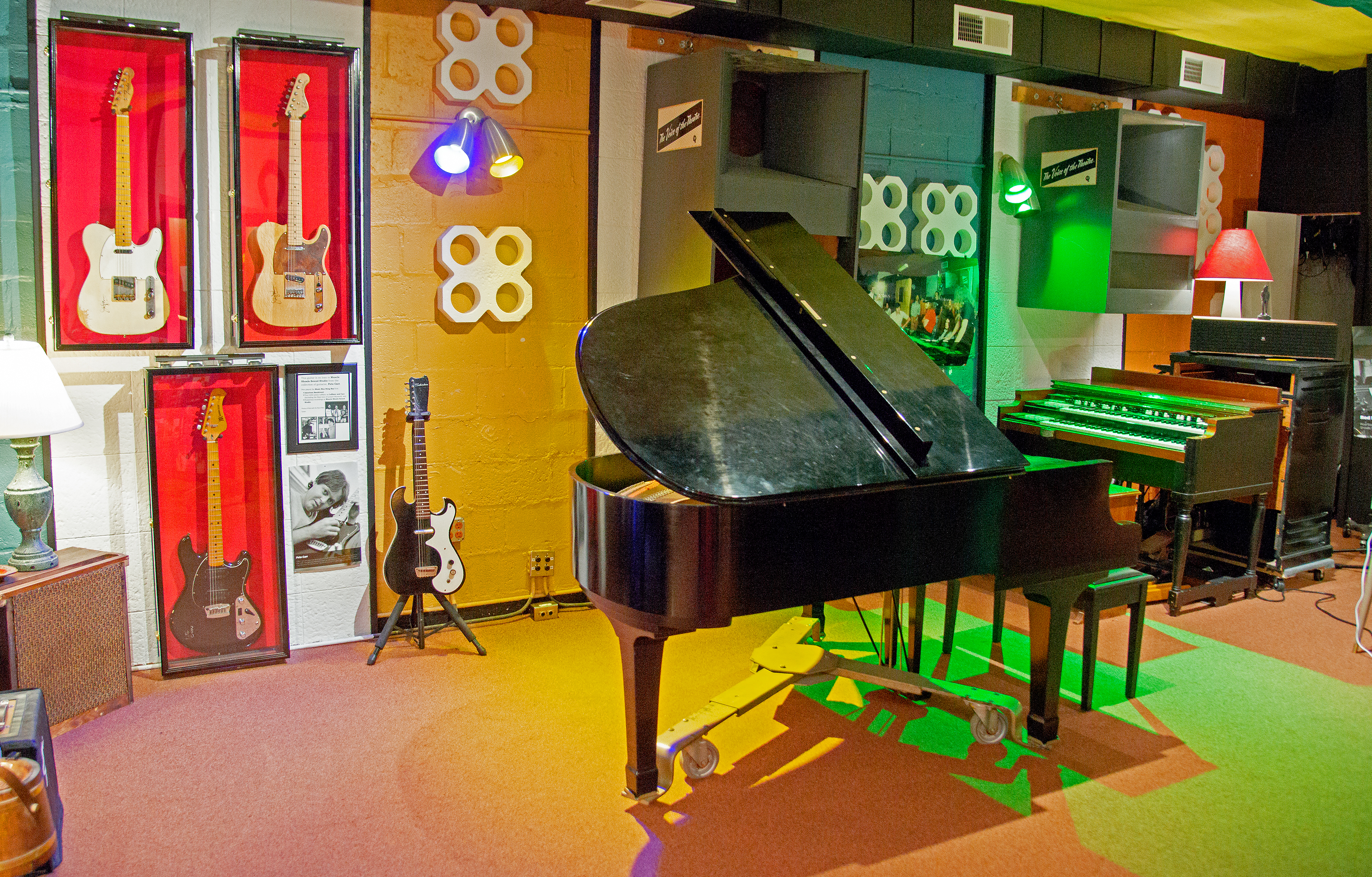
Muscle Shoals Sound Studio, main area in 2025

Sheffield is the home of Muscle Shoals Sound Studios at 3614 Jackson Highway and later at 1000 Alabama Avenue. Cher, The Rolling Stones, The Osmonds, Aretha Franklin, Bob Seger, Lynyrd Skynyrd, Simon & Garfunkel, The Staple Singers and many others recorded in this studio, that remains well known and respected throughout the music industry.

== Demographics ==
Historical population
Census	Pop.	Note	%±
1890	2,731		—
1900	3,333		22.0%
1910	4,865		46.0%
1920	6,682		37.3%
1930	6,221		−6.9%
1940	7,933		27.5%
1950	10,767		35.7%
1960	13,491		25.3%
1970	13,115		−2.8%
1980	11,903		−9.2%
1990	10,380		−12.8%
2000	9,652		−7.0%
2010	9,039		−6.4%
2020	9,403		4.0%
2023 (est.)	9,307	▼	−1.0%
U.S. Decennial Census; 2020 Census

As of the 2023 American Community Survey, there are 4,386 estimated households in Sheffield with an average of 2.12 persons per household. The city has a median household income of $42,097. Approximately 25.7% of the city's population lives at or below the poverty line. Sheffield has an estimated 54.5% employment rate, with 15.9% of the population holding a bachelor's degree or higher and 87.7% holding a high school diploma.

The top five reported ancestries (people were allowed to report up to two ancestries, thus the figures will generally add to more than 100%) were English (98.4%), Spanish (1.6%), Indo-European (0.0%), Asian and Pacific Islander (0.0%), and Other (0.0%).

=== Racial and ethnic composition ===
Sheffield, Alabama – racial and ethnic composition Note: the US Census treats Hispanic/Latino as an ethnic category. This table excludes Latinos from the racial categories and assigns them to a separate category. Hispanics/Latinos may be of any race.
Race / ethnicity (NH = non-Hispanic)	Pop. 2000	Pop. 2010	Pop. 2020	% 2000	% 2010	% 2020
White alone (NH)	6,798	6,220	6,165	70.43%	68.81%	65.56%
Black or African American alone (NH)	2,517	2,409	2,350	26.08%	26.65%	24.99%
Native American or Alaska Native alone (NH)	35	24	20	0.36%	0.27%	0.21%
Asian alone (NH)	27	31	54	0.28%	0.34%	0.57%
Pacific Islander alone (NH)	4	1	2	0.04%	0.01%	0.02%
Other race alone (NH)	5	3	33	0.05%	0.03%	0.35%
Mixed race or multiracial (NH)	121	140	431	1.25%	1.55%	4.58%
Hispanic or Latino (any race)	145	211	348	1.50%	2.33%	3.70%
Total	9,652	9,039	9,403	100.00%	100.00%	100.00%

=== 2020 census ===
As of the 2020 census, there were 9,403 people, 4,255 households, and 2,423 families residing in the city. The median age was 40.1 years. 21.5% of residents were under the age of 18 and 18.4% were 65 years of age or older. For every 100 females, there were 90.1 males, and for every 100 females age 18 and over, there were 84.7 males.

97.9% of residents lived in urban areas, while 2.1% lived in rural areas.

Of the 4,255 households, 25.4% had children under the age of 18 living in them. Of all households, 32.0% were married-couple households, 22.4% were households with a male householder and no spouse or partner present, and 39.6% were households with a female householder and no spouse or partner present. About 37.6% of all households were made up of individuals, and 15.2% had someone living alone who was 65 years of age or older.

There were 4,977 housing units, of which 14.5% were vacant. The homeowner vacancy rate was 3.2% and the rental vacancy rate was 7.9%. The population density was 1,352.4 inhabitants per square mile (522.2/km^{2}), and housing-unit density was 715.8 per square mile (276.4/km^{2}).

=== 2010 census ===
As of the 2010 census there were 9,039 people, 4,055 households, and 2,421 families residing in the city. The population density was 1,419.1 inhabitants per square mile (547.9/km^{2}). There were 4,692 housing units at an average density of 733.1 per square mile (283.1/km^{2}). The racial makeup of the city was 69.68% White, 26.84% African American, 0.28% Native American, 0.34% Asian, 0.07% Pacific Islander, 1.10% from some other races and 1.70% from two or more races. Hispanic or Latino people of any race were 2.33% of the population.

Of the 4,055 households 23.3% had children under the age of 18 living with them, 38.0% were married couples living together, 17.2% had a female householder with no husband present, and 40.3% were non-families. 36.1% of households were one person and 15.4% were one person aged 65 or older. The average household size was 2.23 and the average family size was 2.89.

The age distribution was 21.8% under the age of 18, 8.8% from 18 to 24, 24.9% from 25 to 44, 26.4% from 45 to 64, and 18.0% 65 or older. The median age was 40.4 years. For every 100 females, there were 87.3 males. For every 100 females age 18 and over, there were 91.3 males.

The median household income was $34,910 and the median family income was $42,718. Males had a median income of $39,692 versus $25,464 for females. The per capita income for the city was $19,619. About 16.4% of families and 21.1% of the population were below the poverty line, including 36.3% of those under age 18 and 5.7% of those age 65 or over.

=== 2000 census ===
As of the 2000 census, there were 9,652 people, 4,243 households, and 2,711 families residing in the city. The population density was 1,471.4 inhabitants per square mile (568.1/km^{2}). There were 4,760 housing units at an average density of 725.6 per square mile (280.2/km^{2}). The racial makeup of the city was 71.21% White, 26.21% African American, 0.39% Native American, 0.28% Asian, 0.04% Pacific Islander, 0.57% from some other races and 1.30% from two or more races. Hispanic or Latino people of any race were 1.50% of the population.

Of the 4,243 households 27.2% had children under the age of 18 living with them, 43.3% were married couples living together, 16.7% had a female householder with no husband present, and 36.1% were non-families. 32.5% of households were one person and 15.5% were one person aged 65 or older. The average household size was 2.27 and the average family size was 2.87.

The age distribution was 23.7% under the age of 18, 8.0% from 18 to 24, 26.6% from 25 to 44, 22.6% from 45 to 64, and 19.0% 65 or older. The median age was 39 years. For every 100 females, there were 85.5 males. For every 100 females age 18 and over, there were 80.6 males.

The median household income was $26,673 and the median family income was $33,877. Males had a median income of $30,378 versus $18,033 for females. The per capita income for the city was $16,022. About 16.5% of families and 18.7% of the population were below the poverty line, including 27.5% of those under age 18 and 10.4% of those age 65 or over.

== Transportation ==
There is no fixed-route transit service in Sheffield. However, the Northwest Alabama Council of Local Governments operates a dial-a-ride transit service known as NACOLG Transit.

== Notable people ==
- Arthur Alexander, country music songwriter and soul singer
- Gary Baker, songwriter and famous for "I Swear"
- Bo Carter, College Sports Information Directors of America Hall of Fame member
- Ben Cunningham, founder of the political advocacy group Tennessee Tax Revolt
- Emerson Foote, advertising executive
- Douglas A. Foster, historian and theologian
- Donna Godchaux, musician
- Wayne Greenhaw, writer and journalist
- Howell Heflin, U.S. senator from Alabama
- David Hood, musician
- Rick James, former pitcher for the Chicago Cubs
- Jimmy Johnson, guitarist for the Muscle Shoals Rhythm Section
- John W. Keys, director of the United States Bureau of Reclamation from 2001 to 2006
- Adam Lazzara, lead singer for Taking Back Sunday
- Mitch McConnell, U.S. senator for Kentucky and former senate majority leader
- Alfred Huger Moses, founder and first mayor
- Anthony Piccione, poet
- Willie Ruff, French horn and double bass player
- Harland David Sanders, entrepreneur and steam locomotive stoker
- Roger Dale Stafford, serial killer
- Bill Stough, prelate who served as the eighth Episcopal Church Bishop of Alabama
- Fred Thompson, actor and former U.S. senator from Tennessee
- Kerry Underwood, member of the Alabama House of Representatives
- William Willis, abstract art painter
