= William Willis (artist) =

American abstract painter (born 1943)

- Born: 1943; Sheffield, Alabama
- Known for: painting, drawing, mixed-media
- Movement: abstract

William Willis (born 1943) is an American abstract painter from Sheffield, Alabama.

== Education and career ==
Willis received his Bachelor of Arts in studio art and his Master of Fine Arts in painting from the University of South Florida in Tampa. His works focus on muted colors and the abstraction of the natural world. In the 1980s, he drew inspiration from Eastern philosophy and religion.

In 1989, Willis exhibited works spanning dozens of years at The Phillips Collection in Washington, D.C. while teaching at the Corcoran School at George Washington University. He was appointed to a five-year professorship at Augusta State University as a William S. Morris Eminent Scholar in Art in 2010.

He has received awards and grants from the National Endowment for the Arts, the Vermont Studio Center, the Pollock-Krasner Foundation, the Southeastern Center for Contemporary Art, the University of Maryland, and the Maryland State Arts Council.
