= John Langeloth Loeb Sr. =

American investor

- Born: November 11, 1902; St. Louis, Missouri
- Died: December 8, 1996 (age 94); Manhattan, New York
- Education: B.A. Harvard College
- Alma mater: Dartmouth College
- Spouse: Frances Lehman
- Children: John Langeloth Loeb Jr. Arthur Lehman Loeb; Ann Loeb Bronfman; Judith Loeb Chiara; Deborah Loeb Brice
- Parent(s): Adeline Moses Loeb; Carl Morris Loeb
- Relatives: Alfred Huger Moses (grandfather); Edgar Bronfman Sr. (son-in-law); Alan H. Kempner (brother-in-law); Nicholas M. Loeb (grandson); Edgar Bronfman Jr. (grandson); Matthew Bronfman (grandson); Benjamin Bronfman (great-grandson); Hannah Bronfman (great-granddaughter)

John Langeloth Loeb Sr. (November 11, 1902 – December 8, 1996) was an American investor and executive who served as president of Loeb, Rhoades & Company.

== Early life and education ==
Loeb was born to a Jewish family on November 11, 1902, in St. Louis, Missouri, the son of Adeline (née Moses) and Carl M. Loeb. His father was an immigrant from Germany who made a fortune after gaining control of the American Metal Company (founded by Berthold Hochschild and Jacob Langeloth). Jacob Longeloth was his father's mentor hence his son's middle name. His mother was the daughter of Alabama banker, Alfred Huger Moses. He had three siblings: Carl M. Loeb Jr., Henry A. Loeb and Margaret Loeb Kempner (married to Alan H. Kempner). Loeb attended Dartmouth College and then transferred to Harvard College where he graduated in 1924.

== Career ==
After his graduation, he worked for the American Metal Company in Pittsburgh and in 1929, he went to work for Maurice Wertheim at Wertheim & Company. In 1931, he and his father co-founded the Carl M. Loeb & Company in order to manage the family's holdings with the firm paying $250,000 to become a member of the New York Stock Exchange. Loeb served as a partner. In 1937, the firm merged with Rhoades & Company to form Loeb, Rhoades & Company. During World War II – from 1942 to 1944 – he worked for the United States Treasury and the Office of War Mobilization. In 1955, Loeb became a senior partner in the firm.

In 1964, he organized the National Independent Committee for President Lyndon B. Johnson and Senator Hubert H. Humphrey. In 1973, he pleaded no contest to three federal charges of disguising campaign contributions to Senator Hubert H. Humphrey's 1972 Presidential primary campaign. In 1977, he became chairman and CEO. In 1978, Loeb, Rhoades & Company merged with Hornblower, Weeks, Noyes & Trask to form Loeb, Rhoades, Hornblower & Company; Loeb became co-chairman of the combined firm's finance committee. In 1979, Loeb, Rhoades, Hornblower, & Company merged with Shearson Hayden Stone to form Shearson Loeb Rhoades & Company. In 1981, Shearson Loeb Rhoades & Company was acquired by the American Express Company, becoming Shearson Lehman/American Express. In 1984, he was named an honorary chairman of Shearson Lehman/American Express.

During his career, Loeb served as director of Dome Petroleum, Allied Chemical, Seagrams, General Instrument, Arlen Realty, the Empire Trust Company, the Rome Cable Company, the National Radiator Company, and Deltec. He also served as governor of the New York Stock Exchange and as a member of the advisory committee of the Bank of New York. He operated the Loeb Partners Corporation, a boutique investment banking firm.

== Philanthropy ==
Loeb was an active philanthropist who donated over $200 million in his lifetime. In 1995, he donated $70.5 million to Harvard University, the largest gift Harvard had ever received from a living donor. The Frances L. Loeb Library, the Loeb Drama Center and numerous Loeb fellowships all carry his surname. He donated $7 million to New York University. Being Jewish as well as a close friend of Jerusalem mayor Teddy Kollek, he was a financial supporter of Israel where he funded the building of the Jewish Community Center in East Jerusalem. Loeb served as the chairman of the Institute of Fine Arts, a trustee of the Museum of Modern Art, as chairman and chief executive of the Jacob and Valeria Langeloth Foundation, and as a member of the Harvard Board of Overseers.

== Personal life ==
In 1926, Loeb married Frances Lehman, the daughter of Adele Lewisohn Lehman and Arthur Lehman of Lehman Brothers and granddaughter of Adolph Lewisohn. The couple had two sons: John Langeloth Loeb Jr., former United States Ambassador to Denmark, and bookstore owner Arthur Lehman Loeb; as well as three daughters: Ann Loeb Bronfman (twin to Arthur), a Bennington College graduate who married Edgar Bronfman Sr.; Judith Loeb Chiara, a Vassar and Barnard College graduate who married Marco Chiara, son of Italian novelist Piero Chiara; and Deborah Loeb Brice, who was educated at the Madeira School. He and his wife were collectors of French Impressionist paintings including Manet, Pissarro, Degas, Cézanne, and Renoir. Loeb had homes in Manhattan, New York, Purchase, New York, and Lyford Cay, Nassau, Bahamas.

His portrait was painted by Salvador Dalí in 1958.
