= John Langeloth Loeb Jr. =

American businessman and diplomat (1930–2026)

John Langeloth Loeb Jr. CBE
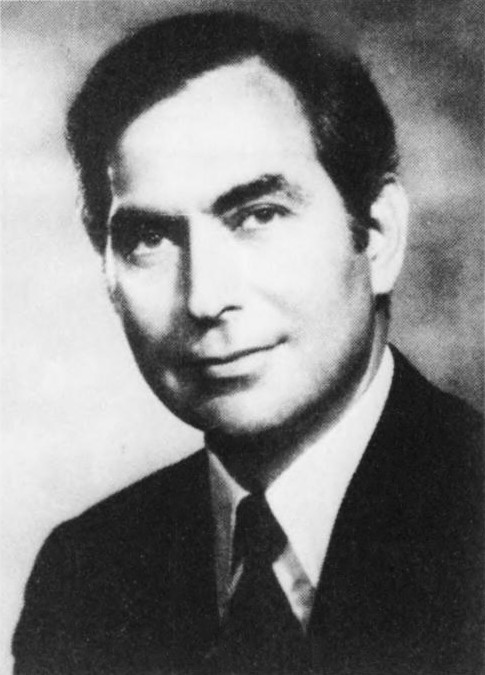

United States ambassador to Denmark
- In office July 30, 1981 – September 13, 1983
- President: Ronald Reagan
- Preceded by: Warren Demian Manshel
- Succeeded by: Terence A. Todman

Personal details
- Born: May 2, 1930 New York City, U.S.
- Died: August 5, 2026 (aged 96)
- Party: Republican
- Spouses: Nina Sundby (m. 1960); Meta Martindell Harrsen; Sharon J. Handler (m. 2012)
- Children: Alexandra Loeb Driscoll (with Sundby); Nicholas Mears Loeb (with Harrsen)
- Parents: John Langeloth Loeb Sr.; Frances Lehman Loeb
- Education: Harvard College; Harvard Business School
- Website: ambassadorloeb.com

John Langeloth Loeb Jr. (May 2, 1930 – August 5, 2026) was an American businessman and diplomat, onetime United States ambassador to Denmark, and a delegate to the United Nations. He was an advocate for religious freedom and separation of church and state, having founded the George Washington Institute for Religious Freedom in 2009. Loeb served as chairman of the George Washington Institute.

== Early life and education ==
John Langeloth Loeb Jr. was born in New York City on May 2, 1930. His parents were businessman John Langeloth Loeb Sr. (1902–1996) and Frances Lehman (1906–1996). Loeb's father and his paternal grandfather, Carl M. Loeb (1875–1955), were founders of Loeb, Rhoades & Co. Loeb's mother was a granddaughter of Mayer Lehman (1830–1897), one of the three founders of Lehman Brothers. Loeb was the grandson of Arthur Lehman (senior partner at Lehman Brothers and founding president of Lehman Brothers) and Adele Lewisohn Lehman. He was a great-grandson of Adolph Lewisohn and grand-nephew of former New York governor and U. S. senator Herbert H. Lehman. His family is of Jewish ancestry.

Loeb and his father share the middle name Langeloth in honor of family friend and businessman John Jacob Langeloth (1852–1914). Loeb received his M.B.A. in 1954 from Harvard Business School.

== Government and public affairs ==
On July 30, 1981, President Ronald Reagan appointed Loeb to the post of United States ambassador to Denmark. He served in this post until September 1983. Upon his return to the United States, he was appointed a delegate to the 38th session of United Nations. He also served as special advisor to Governor Nelson A. Rockefeller on environmental matters (1967–1973) and chairman of New York State Council of Environmental Advisors (1970–1975).

Loeb was chairman of the Keep New York State Clean Program (1971–1975). He was a delegate to the Republican National Convention in 1992 and an alternate delegate to the Republican National Conventions in 1988 and 1992.

== Organizational memberships ==
Loeb was one out of a group of one hundred trustees who work for the American-Scandinavian Foundation. Loeb was chairman of the board of trustees of the Winston Churchill Foundation of the United States (see Churchill Scholarship). Loeb served on the board of advisors of the Department of Ophthalmology at Columbia University Medical Center. From 1966 to 1994 Loeb served on the board of trustees of the Museum of the City of New York.

== George Washington Institute for Religious Freedom ==
Loeb founded the George Washington Institute for Religious Freedom (GWIRF) in 2009 with the goal of raising people's awareness about the roots of religious freedom and the separation of church and state in the United States and the importance of these principles. Loeb served as GWIRF's chairman.

=== Loeb Institute ===
In 2016, Loeb, through the John L. Loeb Jr. Foundation and the George Washington Institute for Religious Freedom, donated $2.5 million to establish the John L. Loeb Jr. Institute for Religious Freedom at George Washington University. The institute operates within the Columbian College of Arts and Sciences.

== Awards and honors ==
On May 7, 1969, Loeb was made a Churchill Fellow of Westminster College in Fulton, Missouri, site of Winston Churchill's famous Iron Curtain speech.

Upon leaving his ambassadorial post in 1983, Margrethe II of Denmark awarded him the Grand Cross of the Order of the Dannebrog.

In 1992, Elizabeth II created him a Commander of the Order of the British Empire.

In 2010, he was invited to deliver the Herbert H. Lehman Memorial Lecture at Lehman College CUNY. He also was bestowed with an honorary Doctor of Laws degree from Georgetown University Law School (1980) and was Person of the Year in 2005 at the Danish American Society.

== Personal life and death ==
Loeb was married three times. In 1960, he married his first wife, Nina Sundby, with whom he has a daughter. His second wife was Meta Martindell Harrsen, with whom he has a son, Nick Loeb. In 2012, Loeb married his third wife, Sharon J. Handler.

Loeb financed the creation of the Loeb Visitors Center at the Touro Synagogue National Historic Site in Newport, Rhode Island.

Loeb died on August 5, 2026, at the age of 96.

Diplomatic posts
Preceded by Warren Demian Manshel	U.S. ambassador to Denmark; 1981–1983	Succeeded by Terence Todman
