= The American Assembly =

American think tank (1950–2023)

- Formation: October 1950; 75 years ago
- Founder: Dwight Eisenhower
- Dissolved: July 5, 2023; 3 years ago
- Type: Think tank
- Tax ID no.: EIN 136160846
- Legal status: Merged into Incite at Columbia University
- Headquarters: 475 Riverside Drive, Suite 456, New York, NY 10115
- Location: Columbia University, New York City
- Region served: United States
- President: Peter Bearman
- Revenue: $1,552,557 (2015)
- Expenses: $1,344,170 (2015)

The American Assembly was a think tank at Columbia University, founded in 1950 by General Dwight Eisenhower. It was his most enduring achievement and legacy as president of Columbia, though some, such as his successor as President of Columbia University, Grayson Kirk, believed that the idea was "naive" and "extremely simplistic."

For over 70 years, it fostered nonpartisan public-policy discussions by convening, research, and publication. Over 100 "American Assemblies" were held on topics ranging from prison reform to healthcare to nuclear disarmament. In more recent years, Assembly projects made a wide range of contributions to economic, urban, and cultural policy, including projects on workforce development, financial regulation, and the role of the arts in American universities.

In July 2023, the American Assembly merged with the Interdisciplinary Center for Innovative Theory and Empirics (INCITE) "to become Incite, an official institute at Columbia University."

== History ==
In 1948, the Trustees of Columbia University agreed to a unique arrangement for a university president to allow Eisenhower to spend much of his time working on behalf of The American Assembly. In his book At Ease: Stories I Tell to Friends, Eisenhower wrote that his inspiration for the Assembly went back to his concerns about how to resolve the enormous social, economic, and political quandaries that had been thrust upon the nation after World War II. He came to believe that by marshalling the intellectual power across a range of sectors, thoughtful men and women could address difficult problems and identify wise solutions. The idea captivated him and was an absorbing pursuit throughout his first year as Columbia president. His conviction that imaginative and profound thought could help to resolve national public policy concerns became the framework for a new organization that he called "The American Assembly." He gave it the short mandate "to illuminate issues of national policy." The American Assembly was officially announced on October 18, 1950, at a luncheon of the Columbia Associates, an alumni and benefactors group that was helping to raise funds for the new entity.

In the late 1940s, only a handful of public policy institutions existed, and structured conferences were a new and evolving form of exchange for the citizenry. Since its inaugural program, The American Assembly initiated hundreds of national projects and many more subsequent programs throughout the United States and the world. Over the years the Assembly, has perfected a technique to allow thousands of participants representing a range of views, interests, and backgrounds to come together to discuss major public policy issues and work out wise solutions. The American Assembly has met Eisenhower's goals by sponsoring research on a vast range of topics, domestic and foreign, organizing meetings, issuing reports of findings and recommendations, and by commissioning books.

Through its published reports and books, it has provided leading law, policy, and decision makers and the general public, schools, and other educational institutions with materials for their own Assembly projects. The Assembly maintains ongoing relationships with a number of institutions that hold their own American Assemblies, such as the US Air Force Academy, which has cosponsored an annual Academy Assembly since 1959. The Assembly has also spawned several autonomous institutions that have been founded following co-sponsoring Assembly programs.

== Programs ==
The American Assembly has engaged in issues that range from business, arts and culture, and philanthropy to the economy, education, race, religion, and security. Notable recent projects include "The Future of the Western Hemisphere: A Shared Vision Toward 2015," "Art, Technology, and Intellectual Property," "The Future of the Accounting Profession," "The Creative Campus," "Retooling for Growth: Building a 21st Century Economy in America’s Older Industrial Areas," and "The Next Generation Project: U.S. Global Policy and the Future of International Institutions."

== Next Generation Project ==
In 2006, The American Assembly's Next Generation Project set out to discover fresh perspectives about US global policy by identifying and engaging the best emerging young talent from a wide range of vocations and regions of the country growing in economic and political importance. The American Assembly convened three-day meetings in Dallas for the Southwest, San Diego for the West Coast, Denver for the Mountain States, and Chicago for the Midwest. Nearly 300 of the country's brightest emerging leaders with a diverse range of views and interests, from multiple professional, geographic, and demographic backgrounds, were identified as Next Generation Project Fellows and participated in the Assemblies. Young businesspeople from cutting-edge biotech and information technology firms, leaders from NGOs, the media, religious organizations, and the military actively participated. Rising stars from the UN, the IMF, and the World Bank, and decision-makers from the Department of State, the Department of Defense, and the National Security Council all participated, as well as political leaders from the state and local level. A National Assembly, drawing on fellows from preceding Assemblies, was held in Washington, DC, as the culminating program in the series.

The success of the project is marked by the continued interest of its fellows network and an expanding consortium of partner institutions.
