= Joseph Rothschild =

American historian

- Born: Joseph Arthur Rothschild; April 5, 1931; Fulda, Germany
- Died: January 30, 2000 (aged 68); New York City, New York, U.S.
- Relatives: Rothschild family
- Awards: Guggenheim Fellowship (1967)

Academic background
- Education: Columbia University (BA, MA); University of Oxford (PhD)

Academic work
- Discipline: European history
- Institutions: Columbia University

Joseph Arthur Rothschild (April 5, 1931, at Fulda, Germany – January 30, 2000, at New York City) was an American professor of history and political science at Columbia University, specializing in Central European and Eastern European history.

Rothschild was a member of the Academy of Political Science, the American Association for the Advancement of Slavic Studies, the Polish Institute of Arts and Sciences of America, Phi Beta Kappa and American Professors for Peace in the Middle East (of which he was the national vice chairman in the years 1975–1990). From 1985 he was also a member of the Commission on International Affairs for the American Jewish Congress.

He served on the editorial boards of the Middle East Review and the Political Science Quarterly. He received a Guggenheim Fellowship In 1967.

Rothschild graduated from Columbia University with a bachelor's and a master's degree. He received his doctorate from the University of Oxford.

== Books ==
- The Communist Party of Bulgaria. New York: Columbia University Press. 1959. hdl:2027/mdp.39015005551562.
- Communist Eastern Europe. New York: Walker and Company. 1964 – via Internet Archive . [adapted from material presented during the Columbia Lectures in International Studies television series]
- Pilsudski's Coup D'État. New York: Columbia University Press. 1966 – via Internet Archive .
- East Central Europe Between the Two World Wars. Seattle and London: University of Washington University Press. 1974 – via Internet Archive.
- Ethnopolitics: A Conceptual Framework. New York: Columbia University Press. 1981. ISBN 9780231052368 – via Internet Archive.
- Return to Diversity: A Political History of East Central Europe Since World War II (2nd ed.). New York and Oxford: Oxford University Press. 1993. ISBN 978-0-19-507381-2 – via Internet Archive.
