= Davidson Kempner Capital Management =

Global institutional alternative investment management firm

Davidson Kempner Capital Management LP
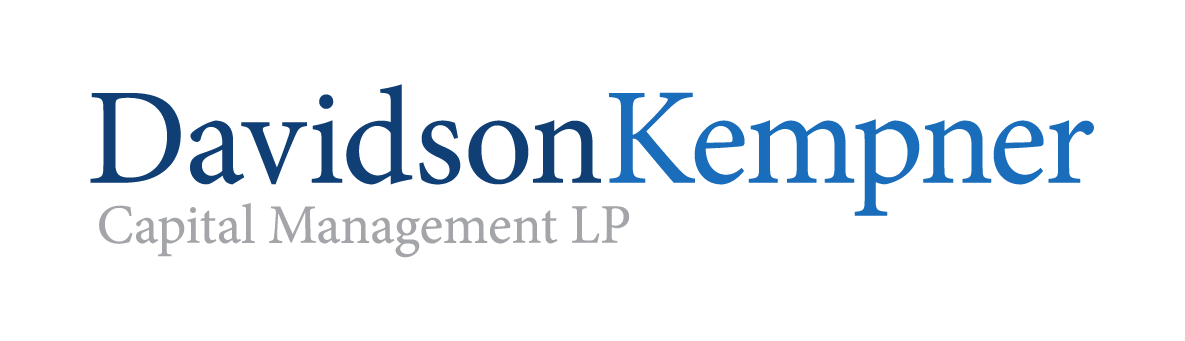

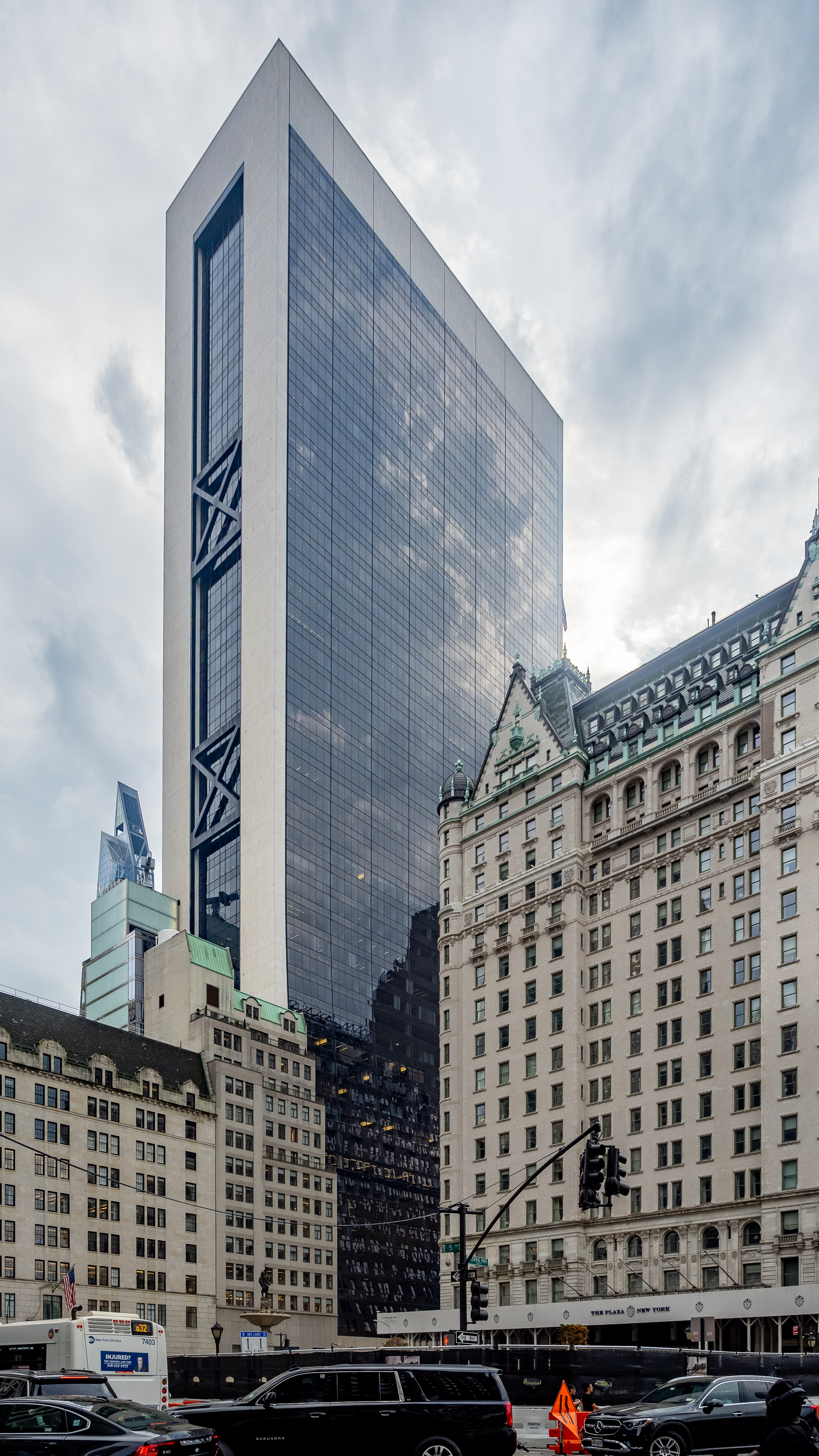
- Headquarters in the Solow Building
- Company type: Private
- Industry: Investment management firm
- Founded: May 1983; 43 years ago
- Founder: Marvin H. Davidson
- Headquarters: 520 Madison Avenue, New York, New York
- Area served: Worldwide
- Key people: Anthony A. Yoseloff (Executive Managing Member)
- AUM: US$36 billion (2023)
- Number of employees: 500 (March 2023)
- Website: davidsonkempner.com

Davidson Kempner Capital Management LP (often known by the short form Davidson Kempner) is a global institutional alternative investment management firm with over $36 billion in assets under management. Davidson Kempner is headquartered in New York City, with additional offices in London, Hong Kong, Dublin, Philadelphia, Shenzhen and Mumbai. The firm is led by Anthony A. Yoseloff who serves as Executive Managing Member and Chief Investment Officer.

As of June 30, 2022, Davidson Kempner was ranked as the eighth largest hedge fund in the world.

Davidson Kempner has approximately 500 employees in the firm's seven offices. The firm is headquartered at 520 Madison Avenue in New York, New York.

== History ==
Davidson Kempner was founded in May 1983 by Marvin H. Davidson and was initially named M.H. Davidson & Co. Thomas L. Kempner Jr. joined the firm in December 1984 and was promoted to partner in 1986 and appointed to executive managing member in January 2004. The firm opened to outside capital in 1987 and was registered as an investment adviser with the U.S. Securities and Exchange Commission in 1990. Michael J. Leffell joined in 1988 and became Deputy Executive Managing Member, where he co-managed the Distressed Securities investment strategy for 20 years.

Anthony A. Yoseloff joined in August 1999 and became a managing member in January 2004. Yoseloff became co-deputy executive managing member in January 2012, and co-executive managing member with Kempner as of January 1, 2018. Kempner retired at the end of 2019.

== Investment strategies ==
Davidson Kempner employs a bottom-up, fundamental method of investing with an event driven focus and a multi-strategy approach.

The firm invests globally in a variety of credit and equity strategies as well as real assets.

== Management ==
Anthony A. Yoseloff is Executive Managing Member and Chief Investment Officer at Davidson Kempner Capital Management. Yoseloff serves on the Board of Trustees of Princeton University and is a member of the Board of Directors of PRINCO, the investment manager of the Princeton University endowment. Yoseloff also serves as a member of the Board of Trustees and on the investment committee of The New York Public Library as well as a member of the Board of Trustees and Vice Chair of the investment committee at New York-Presbyterian. He is a member of the Council on Foreign Relations.

The firm has 13 managing members.
