= Tennessee Tax Revolt =

Political organization

Tennessee Tax Revolt, Inc.
- Abbreviation: TTR
- Formation: 2001
- Type: Public Benefit Corporation
- Location: Nashville, Tennessee
- President: Rick Durham
- Founder and spokesman: Ben Cunningham
- Website: www.tntaxrevolt.com

Tennessee Tax Revolt, Inc. (TTR) is an American anti-tax political advocacy group active in the state of Tennessee.

The organization was incorporated as a public benefit corporation of Tennessee on October 22, 2001. Donation pages on its site note that donations to TTR are not tax-deductible.

In nearly all appearances in the media and speaking engagements, TTR is represented by its spokesman, Nashville real estate investor Ben Cunningham, who is also listed as a founder of the organization.

== History ==
In his book Covenant of Liberty: The Ideological Origins of the Tea Party Movement conservative activist and author Michael Patrick Leahy describes an event that he calls the Tennessee Tax Revolt which he credits as the genesis of the organization of the same name. This was a three-year popular campaign to oppose the institution of a state income tax in Tennessee, a cause championed by Republican Governor Don Sundquist.

Ben Cunningham and state radio personalities Phil Valentine, Steve Gill, Darrell Ankarlo, and Dave Ramsey, aided by Republican lawmakers such as Marsha Blackburn, spearheaded an effort that involved dissemination of information over the air waves, email lists, and a web site, emails and telephone calls to state legislators, postal mailing of tea bags to officials, street protests and driving past the state capitol building while honking their automobile horns, and a tactic that a Los Angeles Times reporter referred to as "steering protesters to lawmakers' homes." According to Mr. Cunningham, in addition to the honking of automobile horns among the activists at the State Capitol there was a competition to produce the loudest noise which was achieved in 2002 with a dismounted train whistle powered by a portable air compressor, requiring other protesters to cover their ears when it was sounded once or twice per day.

In 2001, the Tennessee Tax Revolt organization was incorporated as a public benefit corporation and by the end of 2002 the campaign had been successful and the effort to enact an income tax had ceased. The TTR web site hosts photographs from the 2001 and 2002 protests. In 2004, the group claimed that their email list was subscribed to by 5,000 recipients.

== Activities ==
Cunningham has frequently been interviewed in Tennessee state and local media outlets about tax and budgetary issues. TTR's own events, as well as Tea Party movement and other events and rallies around Tennessee and around the country. He spoke as a panelist at a Tennessee Alliance for Progress event in 2005. In 2009, TTR spoke at a Nashville Tea Party rally in opposition to the federal bank bailouts in response to the 2008 financial crisis and in opposition to the economic stimulus of the American Recovery and Reinvestment Act of 2009. In 2011, Cunningham was a guest speaker at a paid event held by several other state organizations and described as a conservative "grassroots legislative training" session. In a January 2011 presentation to the Tea Party of Bradley County (entitled "How to Fight Local Tax Hikes and Win") Cunningham invoked Khmer Rouge, Stalinist Russia, and the Chinese Communist Party "Thankfully we haven't had to result [sic] in violence and certainly no one is advocating that, but clearly many people have. And clearly many people had the opportunity to fight these forces of tyranny and they didn't do it. Ultimately, the burden is on our shoulders and we've got to accept that burden and we've got to take the time to get involved in government at every level - nationally, state, local." Cunningham moderated a Tennessee 20th Senatorial District Republican candidate discussion forum in 2012.

TTR has sponsored efforts to persuade state officials and candidates to sign a "Taxpayer Protection Pledge" promising not to raise taxes. The organization has also sponsored polls of Tennessee voters on various issues. TTR endorses candidates in state elections; in 2006, it endorsed Edward Glenn Bryant, in his unsuccessful 2006 bid for a Tennessee U.S. Senate seat.

In 2005 TTR gave a "Taxpayer Hero Award" to State Representative Donna Rowland and anointed the City of Memphis the booby prize winner of the "Tennessee Tax Bowl" for having the highest combined county and municipal tax rate in the state.

In 2006 TTR spearheaded a successful effort and petition drive to amend the Nashville city charter requiring any increase in property taxes to be approved by voters.

TTR has spoken out over the property seizures and police raids of Gibson Guitar Corporation in Nashville over alleged violations of the Lacey Act governing the importation of wildlife and plants under conservation protection, specifically hardwoods used in the manufacture of that company's guitars. Speaking at a 2011 rally in support of Gibson, Cunningham called the raids an abusive federal overreach.

In 2011, TTR asked state legislators to work to oppose federal health care reform proposals. That Cunningham spoke at an event sponsored by Ralph Weber's company MediBid and the Association of American Physicians and Surgeons and in an associated radio broadcast said that President Obama's health care reforms would "ruin our medical system" and result in a "decline into mediocrity and tyranny."

In 2012, TTR and Cunningham supported legislation put forward in Tennessee to phase out and then completely eliminate the state inheritance tax. The bill passed the legislature and was signed into law by Governor Bill Haslam.

While most frequently protesting increases in personal taxes, TTR has also opposed some tax breaks offered to large companies and special exceptions to sales taxes. It criticized the budgeting process for a planned Nashville convention center, and in January 2010 called for the recall any city council member who supported issuance of bonds to finance the center. In 2012, Cunningham criticized the state's economic development negotiations with private companies, calling upon Governor Bill Haslam and the State Funding Board to "stop holding these secret negotiations with large corporations over handing out these huge wads of money."

== Pamphlets ==
- How to Fight Local Tax Hikes and Win: Tennessee Tax Revolt Tax Activist Toolkit
- Making an Open Records Request for Government Records in Tennessee
