= Ben Cunningham (activist) =

American activist (born 1947)

Ben Cunningham (born 1947 in Sheffield, Alabama) is a Gallatin, Tennessee real estate investor and founder and spokesman of the grassroots political group Tennessee Tax Revolt, Inc.

Cunningham was an early developer of infrastructure for what became the Internet and established a computer bulletin board service called Nashville Exchange.

Cunnigham and his group advocate a "Taxpayer Bill of Rights" which would amend the Tennessee Constitution in a manner similar to that done in Colorado in the 1990s.
