= Carl M. Loeb =

American businessman born in Germany

- Born: Carl Morris Loeb; September 28, 1875; Frankfurt, Germany
- Died: January 4, 1955 (aged 79); New York City, US
- Known for: President of the American Metal Company; Founder of Carl M. Loeb & Co
- Spouse: Adeline Moses (m. 1896)
- Children: 4, including John Langeloth Loeb Sr.
- Relatives: Alfred Huger Moses (father-in-law); Alan H. Kempner (son-in-law)

Carl Morris Loeb (1875–1955) was a German-born American businessman who served as the president of the American Metal Company and the founder of Carl M. Loeb & Co, which became Loeb, Rhoades & Co. in 1938.

== Early life and education ==
Carl Morris Loeb was born to a middle-class Jewish family on September 28, 1875, in Frankfurt, Germany, the son of Minna (née Cohn) and Adolph Loeb. His parents were dry goods merchants and he had one older brother, Julius, and one younger sister, Ella.

== Career ==
=== American Metal Company ===
In 1893, Loeb graduated from gymnasium and moved to New York City to work with his brother at the American Metal Company (AMCO), a lead and zinc trader and subsidiary of Metallgesellschaft AG (founded by Wilhelm Ralph Merton, Leo Ellinger, and Zachary Hochschild). In 1893, he moved to St. Louis to assist at a branch office (and also met his future wife) and was promoted to branch manager after convincing then AMCO president Jacob Langeloth that he could handle the responsibility despite being only 21. In 1898, he became a U.S. citizen. Loeb vertically integrated the company by expanding into the ownership of smelting and refining facilities while securing his supply of raw materials by signing exclusive contracts with large mines to purchase their entire output; and then processing them at AMCO-owned facilities. He also expanded AMCO's activities into Mexico with investments in lead, silver and zinc mining first as an agent for its parent Metallgesellschaft and later as a direct investor during World War I. In 1917, AMCO refined 250 million pounds of copper, 547 million pounds of zinc, and 168 million pounds of lead. Loeb became president of AMCO after Longeloth died in 1914.

Before the United States entered World War I in October 1917, Metallgesellschaft (then led by Richard Merton, the son of Wilhelm Ralph Merton), transferred its 51% ownership in AMCO to several American citizens who were also AMCO managers. Once the US entered the war, the US passed the Trading with the Enemy Act 1914 which required that German-owned business assets be held by the Office of Alien Property Custodian. Despite Merton's efforts to hide Metallgesellschaft's ownership, Loeb reported to the agency that the assets were in reality still owned by their German parent and the stock was then transferred into a trust which was supervised by Henry Morgenthau Sr., Berthold Hochschild, and Joseph F. Guffey.

In 1918, the Alien Property Custodian sold the 51% stake it had confiscated at a public auction for $5.75 million with many of the shares being purchased by a syndicate of investors including Ludwig Vogelstein (who had 20%), Berthold Hochschild, and Loeb. In 1920, Berthold Hochschild was appointed chairman of the board with Loeb as president and various investors as vice presidents including Otto Sussman, Henry Bruère, Harold K. Hochschild, Carl's brother Julius Loeb, and Vogelstein. Later, Andrew Mellon joined the board to represent the government's interest. In 1921, Richard Merton filed a claim with the government asserting that the confiscation of AMCO shares was unlawful as the shares had been transferred to a Swiss subsidiary before the U.S. involvement in World War I; he also bribed some government officials to assist in his recovery. Unfortunately for Merton, the bribes were exposed and the claim rejected (and President Harding's Attorney General Harry Daugherty was tried and acquitted twice for his alleged involvement).

In 1929, Loeb resigned as AMCO's president over a disagreement in AMCO's taking on debt to fund the purchase of copper mining interests in Africa (previously, AMCO had minimized its ownership in mines and instead relied on exclusive supply contracts). The board purchased Loeb's 80,000 shares for eighty-five dollars apiece which was fortuitous for Loeb as the Wall Street Crash of 1929 followed later in the year.

=== Carl M. Loeb & Co ===
In December 1930, Loeb and his son John L. Loeb formed Carl M. Loeb and Company, paying $250,000 to become a member of the Wall Street Stock Exchange. The company later merged with Rhoades & Company, a company that was hit hard during the Great Depression and needed capital to bolster its position, to form Loeb, Rhoades & Co. in 1938.

== Personal life ==
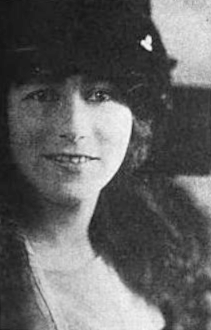
Adeline Moses Loeb

On November 12, 1896, Loeb married Adeline Moses, daughter of Alfred Huger Moses; they had four children:

- Margaret Loeb Kempner (born 1899), who married stockbroker and publishing executive Alan H. Kempner and whose children are managing the family business bearing the surname of Kempner.
- John Langeloth Loeb Sr. (born 1902), co-founder and president of Loeb, Rhoades & Co., who married Frances Lehman Loeb, a granddaughter of Mayer Lehman, one of the three co-founders of Lehman Brothers,
- Carl M. Loeb Jr. (born 1904), investment banker and founder of the National Crime Prevention Council.
- Henry A. Loeb (born 1907), investment banker.

Loeb died January 4, 1955, in New York City.
