= Loeb, Rhoades & Co. =

Brokerage Firm

- Type: Defunct
- Industry: Brokerage
- Founded: 1931
- Founders: Carl M. Loeb; John Langeloth Loeb Sr.
- Fate: Merged with Shearson Hayden Stone to form Shearson Loeb Rhoades, later Shearson/American Express
- Headquarters: New York City, United States

Loeb, Rhoades & Co. was a Wall Street brokerage firm founded in 1931 and acquired in 1979 by Sanford I. Weill's Shearson Hayden Stone. Although the firm would operate as Shearson Loeb Rhoades for two years, the firm would ultimately be acquired in 1981 by American Express to form Shearson/American Express and three years later Shearson Lehman/American Express.

== History ==
The firm was founded as Carl M. Loeb & Co. by Jewish father Carl M. Loeb and son John Langeloth Loeb Sr. in 1931, shortly after the onset of the Great Depression. Carl M. Loeb & Co. merged with Rhoades & Company, a white shoe Wall Street brokerage firm, in 1937 to form what became Loeb, Rhoades & Co. Rhoades & Company had been founded in 1905 by John Harsen Rhoades Jr. (born 1869), formerly a partner of Rhoades & Richmond. The firm operated under the Loeb, Rhoades name from 1937 through 1979 when it briefly used the name Shearson Loeb Rhoades, for two years prior to its acquisition by American Express in 1981.

Carl Loeb, who had built his personal wealth as president of American Metal Company resigned from the company and bought a seat on the New York Stock Exchange, at the urging of his son John in 1931. While on the New York Stock Exchange, he pushed through many reforms. Three years after Loeb left American Metals, the company's stock was nearly worthless. Together with his son, Carl ran Loeb, Rhoades for its first 24 years, from 1931 until his death in 1955. John L. Loeb was a partner in the firm from 1931 to 1955 and following the death of his father became the senior partner, a role which he retained through 1977 when the firm was merged. In 1951, John Loeb became a governor of the New York Stock Exchange. In 1956, Loeb, Rhoades acquired a controlling interest in the Cuban Atlantic Sugar Company and sold its stake on December 31, 1958, a day before the Cuban Revolution.

In 1973, Carl M. Mueller assumed management control of the firm before Loeb resumed his management responsibilities in the firm in 1977. Loeb oversaw the merger of Loeb, Rhoades with Hornblower, Weeks, Noyes & Trask to form Loeb, Rhoades, Hornblower & Co. in January 1978 before handing over day to day control of the firm to his nephew, Thomas Kempner, a grandson of Carl Loeb who had joined the firm in 1950.

The Hornblower merger turned out to be disastrous for Loeb, Rhoades. The two firms incurred significant costs attempting to merge their back office operations, both of which had issues prior to the merger. By the end of 1978, less than a year after the merger, the combined firm was losing millions of dollars. Through the 1960s and 1970s, Sanford I. Weill was acquiring brokerage firms and by 1979 was running Shearson Hayden Stone, the culmination of nearly a dozen acquisitions. By early 1979, Loeb, Rhoades, now known as Loeb, Rhoades, Hornblower & Co. was suffering and looking for a potential acquiror. During Mothers Day Weekend 1979, Loeb and Shearson agreed to a merger to form Shearson Loeb Rhoades. Weill was named the CEO of the combined firm and John Loeb became the firm's chairman. At the time, Shearson Loeb Rhoades was among the largest investment banking houses with $250 million of equity capital.

In 1981, Shearson Loeb Rhoades bought the Boston Company holding company of the Boston Safe Deposit & Trust Co., a money manager. The same year, Weill sold the combined company to American Express to form Shearson/American Express.

== Loeb Partners Corporation ==
Loeb Partners Corporation, a registered broker-dealer and investment advisor, had close ties with Loeb, Rhoades. Loeb Partners Corporation was founded by Thomas L. Kempner in 1982 to focus on managing assets for the Loeb family, wealthy clientele and institutions. Kempner, a grandson of Carl M. Loeb, was the final chairman of Loeb, Rhoades, serving from 1978 until the sale of the company in 1979.

Loeb Partners launched the Loeb Arbitrage Fund in 1988 as an investment vehicle for the Loeb family and other family office clients.

In 2008, Loeb Capital Management, a d/b/a for Loeb Arbitrage Management, Loeb Offshore Management and Carl M. Loeb Advisory Partners Inc., was launched under common control with Loeb Partners Corporation.

In 2013 Loeb Capital Management was renamed Loeb King Capital Management.

== Acquisition history ==
The following is an illustration of the company's major mergers and acquisitions and historical predecessors (this is not a comprehensive list):

- Shearson Lehman Hutton (merged 1988)
  - Shearson Lehman Brothers (merged 1984)
    - Shearson/American Express (merged 1981)
      - American Express
        (est. 1850)
      - Shearson Loeb Rhoades (acquired 1981)
        - Shearson Hayden Stone (merged 1973)
          - Hayden Stone, Inc. (formerly CBWL-Hayden Stone, merged 1970)
            - Cogan, Berlind, Weill & Levitt
              (formerly Carter, Berlind, Potoma & Weill, est. 1960)
            - Hayden, Stone & Co.
          - Shearson, Hammill & Co.
            (est. 1902)
        - Loeb, Rhoades, Hornblower & Co. (merged 1978)
          - Loeb, Rhoades & Co. (merged 1937)
            - Carl M. Loeb & Co.
              (est. 1931)
            - Rhoades & Company
              (est. 1905)
          - Hornblower, Weeks, Noyes & Trask (merged 1953-1977)
            - Hornblower & Weeks
              (est. 1888)
            - Hemphill, Noyes & Co.
              (est. 1919, acq. 1963)
            - Spencer Trask & Co.
              (est. 1866 as Trask & Brown)
            - Paul H. Davis & Co.
              (est. 1920, acq. 1953)
    - Lehman Brothers Kuhn Loeb (merged 1977)
      - Lehman Brothers
        (est. 1850)
      - Kuhn, Loeb & Co.
        (est. 1867)
      - Abraham & Co.
        (est. 1938, acq. 1975)
  - E. F. Hutton & Co.
    (est. 1904)

== Notable alumni ==
- Daniel J. Bernstein, American businessman and left-wing political activist
- William Eacho, business executive and United States Ambassador to Austria
- Mario Gabelli, an American stock investor, investment advisor and financial analyst
- Ajit Hutheesing, head of International Capital Partners
- E. Pierce Marshall, American businessman and a son of J. Howard Marshall II
- Michael Steinhardt, investor and philanthropist
- Walter Schloss, American Investor, fund manager, and philanthropist (1916–2012)
- Armand G. Erpf, investor and art collector, chairman of the Crowell-Collier Publishing Company
- Paul F. Warburg, American investment banker

== See also ==
- Cogan, Berlind, Weill & Levitt
- Hayden, Stone & Co.
- Hornblower & Weeks
- Shearson/American Express
- Shearson, Hammill & Co.
