= Morgenthau =

Morgenthau is a German surname meaning "morning dew". Notable people with the surname include:

- Hans Morgenthau (1904–1980), German-American international relations theorist
- Henry Morgenthau Sr. (1856–1946), American diplomat and businessman
  - son: Henry Morgenthau Jr. (1891–1967), United States Secretary of the Treasury and proponent of the Morgenthau Plan
    - wife: Elinor Morgenthau (1891–1949) (née Fatman), American Democratic party activist
    - son: Robert M. Morgenthau (1919–2019), American lawyer
    - son: Henry Morgenthau III (1917–2018) American author and television producer
      - son: Kramer Morgenthau (1966–) American cinematographer

== In popular culture ==
Some fictional characters with this surname are:

- Karl Morgenthau
- Karli Morgenthau

== See also ==
- Morgenthau Lectures, named after Hans Morgenthau
- Ambassador Morgenthau's Story (1918), published memoirs of Henry Morgenthau Sr.
- Morgenthau Report, a report issued by the United States' commission led by Henry Morgenthau Sr.
- USCGC Morgenthau (WHEC-722), a U.S. Coast Guard cutter
- Morgenthau Plan, a plan for the occupation of Germany after World War II.
