= Henry Morgenthau =

Henry Morgenthau may refer to:

- Henry Morgenthau Sr. (1856–1946), United States diplomat
- Henry Morgenthau Jr. (1891–1967), United States Secretary of the Treasury
- Henry Morgenthau III (1917–2018), author and television producer of Screamers (2006)
