= Kramer Morgenthau =

American cinematographer

- Born: June 6, 1966 (age 60)
- Years active: 1990–present
- Spouse: Tracy Fleischman (m. 2011)
- Children: 2
- Parents: Henry Morgenthau III; Ruth Schachter Morgenthau
- Family: Mayer Lehman (great-great-grandfather); Henry Morgenthau Sr. (great-grandfather); Henry Morgenthau Jr. (grandfather); Elinor Morgenthau (grandmother); Robert Morgenthau (uncle)

Kramer Morgenthau, A.S.C. (born June 6, 1966), is an American cinematographer and a member of both the Morgenthau and the Lehman family.

== Background ==
Morgenthau was raised in Cambridge, Massachusetts.

His father, Henry Morgenthau III, was a producer of documentaries for the flagship PBS station, WGBH-TV, in Boston and his mother, Ruth (née Schachter), was a Polish Jewish refugee from WWII Vienna; was a professor of international politics at Brandeis University; served as an advisor to Presidents John F. Kennedy, Lyndon B. Johnson, and Jimmy Carter on Africa; and in 1988 ran unsuccessfully as a Democratic candidate for Congress in Rhode Island. He has one brother, Henry "Ben" Morgenthau and one sister, Sarah Elinor Morgenthau Wessel.

His great-great-grandfather was businessman Mayer Lehman. His grandfather was Henry Morgenthau Jr., the U.S. Treasury secretary during the Roosevelt administration. His great-grandfather, Henry Morgenthau Sr., was the ambassador to the Ottoman Empire during World War I; his uncle is Robert M. Morgenthau, Manhattan district attorney for 35 years.

== Career ==
His early career began in New York as a documentary filmmaker, which led him to shoot Allan Miller's Academy Award-nominated film, Small Wonders, as well as Sundance Festival feature film, Joe & Joe, which began his years as a festival fixture, shooting seven more features and documentaries that played there.

Morgenthau is an active member of the Academy of Motion Picture Arts and Sciences, the American Society of Cinematographers, the Academy of Television Arts and Sciences, and the International Cinematographers Guild.

== Personal life ==
In 2011, he married Tracy Fleischman in a Jewish ceremony at the former Cathedral of Saint Vibiana in Los Angeles.

He currently lives in Los Angeles, California with his wife and twin children.

== Filmography ==
=== Film ===
Year	Title	Director	Notes
1995	Give a Damn Again	Adam Isidore	With Robert Levi and Maryse Alberti
1995	Multiple Futures	Alyce Wittenstein	With Richard E. Brooks
1996	Joe & Joe	David Wall	
1997	Dogtown	George Hickenlooper	
1997	Destination Unknown	Nestor Miranda	
1998	Bombay Boys	Kaizad Gustad	
1998	Welcome to Hollywood	Tony Markes; Adam Rifkin	With Rob Bennett, Nick Mendoz and Howard Wexler
1999	The Big Brass Ring	George Hickenlooper	
1999	Wirey Spindell	Eric Schaeffer	
1999	Pigeonholder	Michael Swanhaus	
1999	The Woman Chaser	Robinson Devor	
2000	Cowboys and Angels	Gregory C. Haynes	
2001	Green Dragon	Timothy Linh Bui	
2001	The Man from Elysian Fields	George Hickenlooper	
2002	Empire	Franc. Reyes	
2003	Dreaming of Julia	Juan Gerard	
2004	Godsend	Nick Hamm	
2005	Havoc	Barbara Kopple	
2007	Full of It	Christian Charles	
2007	Fracture	Gregory Hoblit	
2007	Feast of Love	Robert Benton	
2008	The Express: The Ernie Davis Story	Gary Fleder	
2012	The Factory	Morgan O'Neill	
2013	Thor: The Dark World	Alan Taylor	
2014	Chef	Jon Favreau	
2015	Terminator Genisys	Alan Taylor	
2017	Rebel in the Rye	Danny Strong	
2018	The Darkest Minds	Jennifer Yuh Nelson	
2018	Creed II	Steven Caple Jr.	
2021	Waiting for Godot	Scott Elliot	
2021	Respect	Liesl Tommy	
2021	The Many Saints of Newark	Alan Taylor	
2022	Spirited	Sean Anders	
2023	Creed III	Michael B. Jordan	
2025	Captain America: Brave New World	Julius Onah	
2027	Protecting Jared	Ruben Fleischer	

=== Television ===
Year	Title	Director	Notes
1998	Itzhak Perlman: Fiddling for the Future	Allan Miller	TV special
2005	Blind Justice	Gary Fleder	Episode "Pilot"
2005	Over There		Also directed episode "Orphans"
2006	The Evidence	Gary Fleder	Episode "Pilot"
2006	Saved	Darnell Martin	Episode "A Day in the Life"
2008	Life on Mars	Gary Fleder	Episode "Out Here in the Fields"
2009	FlashForward	David S. Goyer	Episode "No More Good Days"
2010	Boardwalk Empire	Jeremy Podeswa; Tim Van Patten; Brian Kirk; Simon Cellan Jones	Episodes "Anastasia, "Family Limitation", "Hold Me in Paradise", "The Emerald City" and "A Return to Normalcy"
2011	The Playboy Club	Alan Taylor	Episode "Pilot"
2012	Game of Thrones	Alan Taylor	Episodes "The North Remembers" and "The Night Lands"
2012	Vegas	James Mangold	Episode "Pilot"
2013	Sleepy Hollow	Len Wiseman	Episode "Pilot" (Also made an uncredited cameo as George Washington)
2017	The Orville	Jon Favreau	Episode "Pilot"
2027	Oswald	Jon Favreau	Episode "Pilot"

TV movies

Year	Title	Director
1999	The Caseys	Michael Steinberg
2002	Untitled Paul Simms pilot	Timothy Van Patten
2004	The Five People You Meet in Heaven	Lloyd Kramer
2011	Too Big to Fail	Curtis Hanson
2018	Fahrenheit 451	Ramin Bahrani
2019	American Son	Kenny Leon

=== Documentary works ===
Film

Year	Title	Director	Notes
1995	Synthetic Pleasures	Iara Lee	With Marcus Hahn Toshifumi Furusawa
1995	Small Wonders	Allan Miller	
1995	Varga Girl	Wolfgang Hastert	
1999	Music Bridges Over Troubled Waters	Marc Cadieux	
2003	Mayor of the Sunset Strip	George Hickenlooper	With Igor Meglic
2004	Three of Hearts: A Postmodern Family	Susan Kaplan	With Sarah Cawley, Samuel M. Henriques and Don Lenzer
2004	A Different Kind of Blue	Murray Lerner	
