= 1962 New York gubernatorial election =

- November 6, 1962
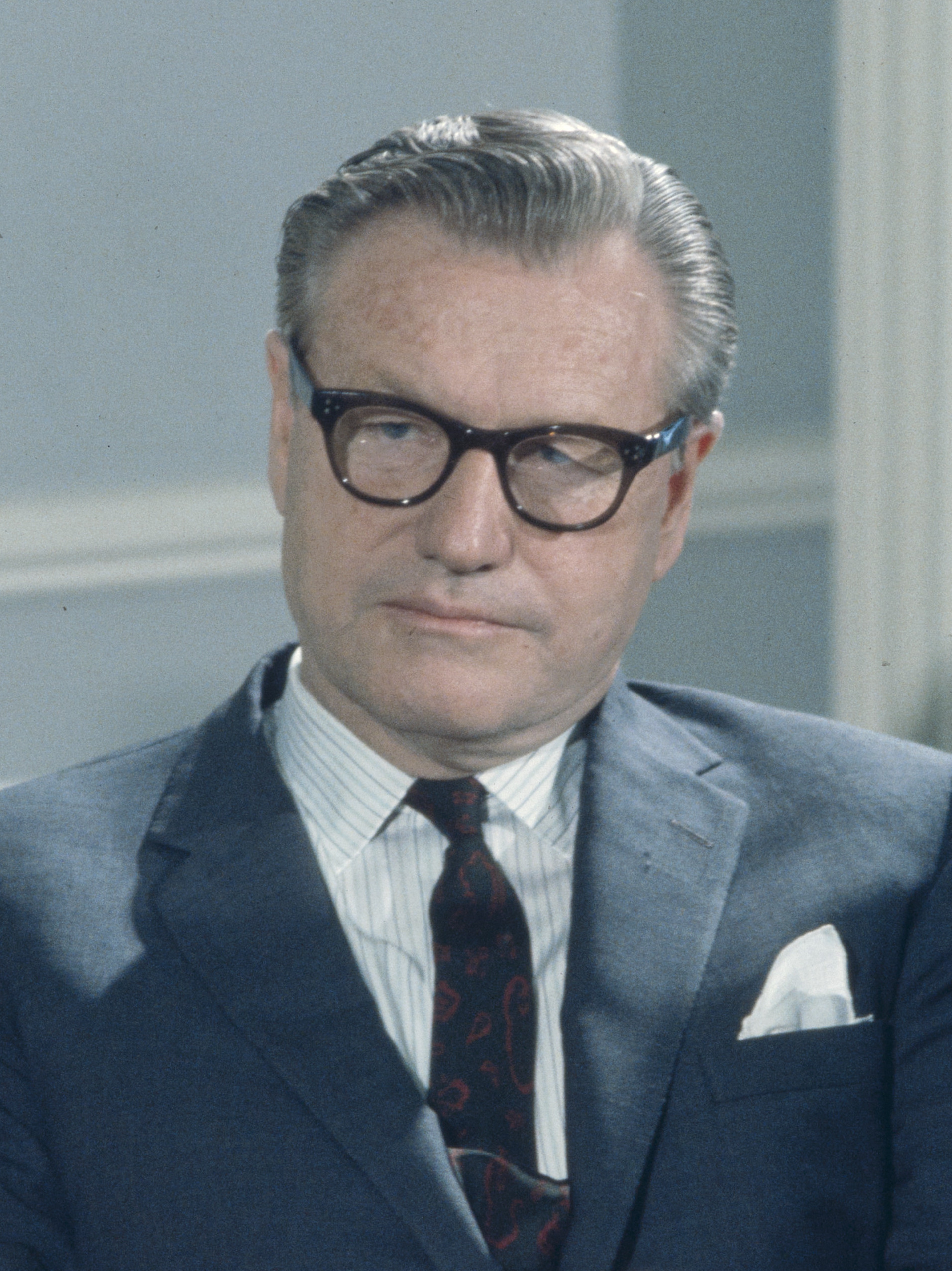

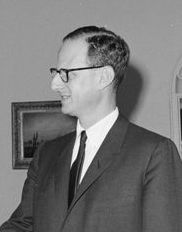
Nominee	Nelson Rockefeller	Robert Morgenthau
Party	Republican	Democratic
Alliance		Liberal
Running mate	Malcolm Wilson	John J. Burns
Popular vote	3,081,587	2,552,418
Percentage	53.08%	43.96%
- County results Rockefeller: 40–50% 50–60% 60–70% 70–80% Morgenthau: 50–60%
Governor before election
Nelson Rockefeller
Republican
Elected Governor
Nelson Rockefeller
Republican

The 1962 New York gubernatorial election was held on November 8, 1962, to elect the Governor and Lieutenant Governor of New York. Incumbent Republican governor Nelson Rockefeller won re-election to a second term in office over U.S. Attorney Robert Morgenthau.

== Democratic nomination ==
=== Candidates ===
- James Farley, former Postmaster General of the United States and chair of the Democratic National Committee
- Robert Morgenthau, U.S. Attorney for the Southern District of New York and son of former U.S. Treasury Secretary Henry Morgenthau Jr.
- Frank D. O'Connor, District Attorney of Queens County
- Samuel S. Stratton, U.S. Representative from Schenectady
- Howard J. Samuels, industrialist and philanthropist

==== Withdrew ====
- Abraham Beame, New York City Comptroller (at convention)

=== Campaign ===
Robert Morgenthau began exploring campaign only thirty-three days before the Democratic convention, when President John F. Kennedy and mayor of New York City Robert F. Wagner Jr. met in Washington. With only two weeks before the convention, Morgenthau publicly acknowledged his candidacy and resigned as United States Attorney to actively campaign. Wagner staked his political prestige on the Morgenthau campaign.

=== Results ===
The Democratic state convention met in Syracuse from September 16 to 18. The convention opened with a keynote speech from mayor Wagner, who attacked Governor Rockefeller as a reactionary and compared him to Barry Goldwater. Other speakers attacking Rockefeller included former governors Herbert H. Lehman and W. Averell Harriman, who called Rockefeller a "part-time governor" more interested in being President in 1964. The convention delegates nominated Morgenthau for governor on the unanimously on the second ballot, after he fell seven votes short on the first ballot.

At the opening of the convention, Morgenthau appeared likely to win a first-ballot majority with the support of both the Bronx, where party boss Charles A. Buckley announced he would lead at least 106 of the 110 delegates to support Morgenthau, and Brooklyn, which abandoned favorite son Abraham Beame on the first ballot. Buckley's endorsement was considered particularly decisive, since Wagner had supported a primary challenge to Buckley earlier in 1962 and sought to unseat him as Bronx party boss.

However, when the roll was called, Morgenthau's base of support in Manhattan and Westchester County was less solid than expected, and the first ballot left him seven votes short. In Manhattan, reformist delegates had voted for Samuels or Stratton, while in Westchester, O'Connor had captured fifteen of the forty-five delegates.

1962 New York Democratic convention, first ballot
Party	Candidate	Votes	%
Democratic	Robert Morgenthau	563	49.47%
Democratic	Frank D. O'Connor	375	32.95%
Democratic	Samuel S. Stratton	103	9.05%
Democratic	Howard J. Samuels	74	6.50%
Democratic	James A. Farley	22	1.93%
Democratic	Abraham Beame (withdrawn)	1	0.09%
Total votes		1,138	100.00%

After the second ballot showed Morgenthau making inroads in Queens, O'Connors base, support for O'Connor collapsed. Morgenthau ultimately won fifty delegates in Queens before the vote was made unanimous.

=== Aftermath ===
The Liberal Party met on September 19 and endorsed the Democratic ticket.

== General election ==
=== Candidates ===
- Richard Garza, restaurant employee, seaman, and candidate for Mayor of New York City in 1961 (Socialist Workers)
- Eric Hass, perennial candidate (Socialist Labor)
- David H. Jaquith, industrialist (Conservative)
- Robert Morgenthau, U.S. Attorney for the Southern District of New York (Democratic and Liberal)
- Nelson Rockefeller, incumbent Governor since 1959 (Republican)

=== Results ===
1962 New York gubernatorial election
Party	Candidate	Votes	%	±%
Republican	Nelson Rockefeller (incumbent)	3,081,587	53.08%	▼2.06
Democratic	Robert Morgenthau	2,309,743	39.78%	▼0.25
Liberal	Robert Morgenthau	242,675	4.18%	▼0.10
Total	Robert Morgenthau	2,552,418	43.96%	▼0.35
Conservative	David H. Jaquith	141,877	2.44%	N/A
Socialist Workers	Richard Garza	19,968	0.34%	N/A
Socialist Labor	Eric Hass	9,762	0.17%	N/A
Total votes		5,805,612	100.00%	

== Works cited ==
- Benjamin, Gerald; Catalano, Michael (2020). Beyond Donkeys and Elephants: Minor Political Parties in Contemporary American Politics. University Press of Kansas. doi:10.2307/j.ctv15tt76n. ISBN 978-0-7006-2929-9.
- Soyer, Daniel (2021). Left in the Center: The Liberal Party of New York and the Rise and Fall of American Social Democracy. Cornell University Press. ISBN 9781501759888. JSTOR 10.7591/j.ctv1hw3x50.2.
