= Ruth S. Morgenthau =

American professor and advisor to Jimmy Carter

Ruth Schachter Morgenthau
- Born: Ruth Schachter; January 26, 1931; Vienna, Austria
- Died: November 4, 2006 (aged 75); Boston, Massachusetts
- Education: Barnard College; Institut d'Études Politiques; Oxford
- Occupation: Professor
- Spouse: Henry Morgenthau (m. 1962)
- Children: 3 (including Kramer)

Ruth Schachter Morgenthau (January 26, 1931 – November 4, 2006), was a professor of international politics at Brandeis University and an advisor to President Jimmy Carter on rural development in poor countries.

== Biography ==
She was born in Vienna, Austria, on January 26, 1931, as Ruth Schachter. Her parents, Osias Schachter and Mizia (Kramer) Schachter, owned a textile importing company until they fled from the Nazis in 1940. She graduated from Barnard College in 1952, then attended the Institut d'Études Politiques in Paris as a Fulbright scholar. In 1958, she received a doctorate in politics from Oxford.

She was a member of the United States Mission to the United Nations, and in 1988 ran unsuccessfully as a Democratic candidate for Congress in Rhode Island. She was an advocate of ''bottom-up'' aid to farmers and villagers in the third world and was a mentor to Nancy Hafkin who brought the internet connectivity to Africa.

Ruth married to Henry Morgenthau in 1962. They had two sons: Henry (Ben) Morgenthau (born 1964) and cinematographer Kramer Morgenthau (born 1966); and a daughter, Sarah Elinor Morgenthau Wessel (born 1963).

She died on November 4, 2006, aged 75, in Boston, Massachusetts.

== Awards ==
In 1964, she wrote Political Parties in French-Speaking West Africa, which won the 1965 Herskovitz Prize.
