= Henry Morgenthau III =

American author and television producer (1917–2018)

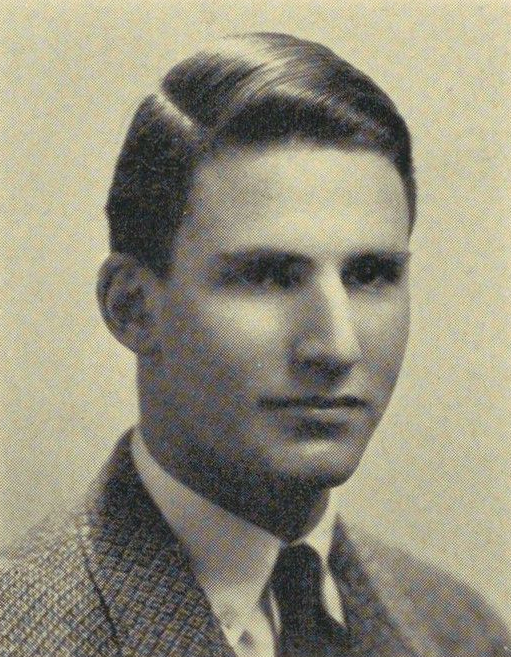
- Morgenthau in the Princeton University yearbook, 1939
- Born: January 11, 1917; New York City, U.S.
- Died: July 10, 2018 (aged 101); Washington, D.C., U.S.
- Education: Princeton University
- Occupations: Author and television producer
- Spouse: Ruth Schachter Morgenthau (m. 1962; died 2006)
- Children: 3, including Kramer
- Parents: Henry Morgenthau Jr.; Elinor Fatman Morgenthau
- Relatives: Robert Morgenthau (brother); Henry Morgenthau Sr. (grandfather); Mayer Lehman (great-grandfather); Helen Morgenthau Fox (aunt); Barbara W. Tuchman (cousin); Anne W. Simon (cousin)

Henry Morgenthau III (January 11, 1917 – July 10, 2018) was an American author and television producer, and scion of the Morgenthau dynasty and member of the Lehman family.

== Family ==
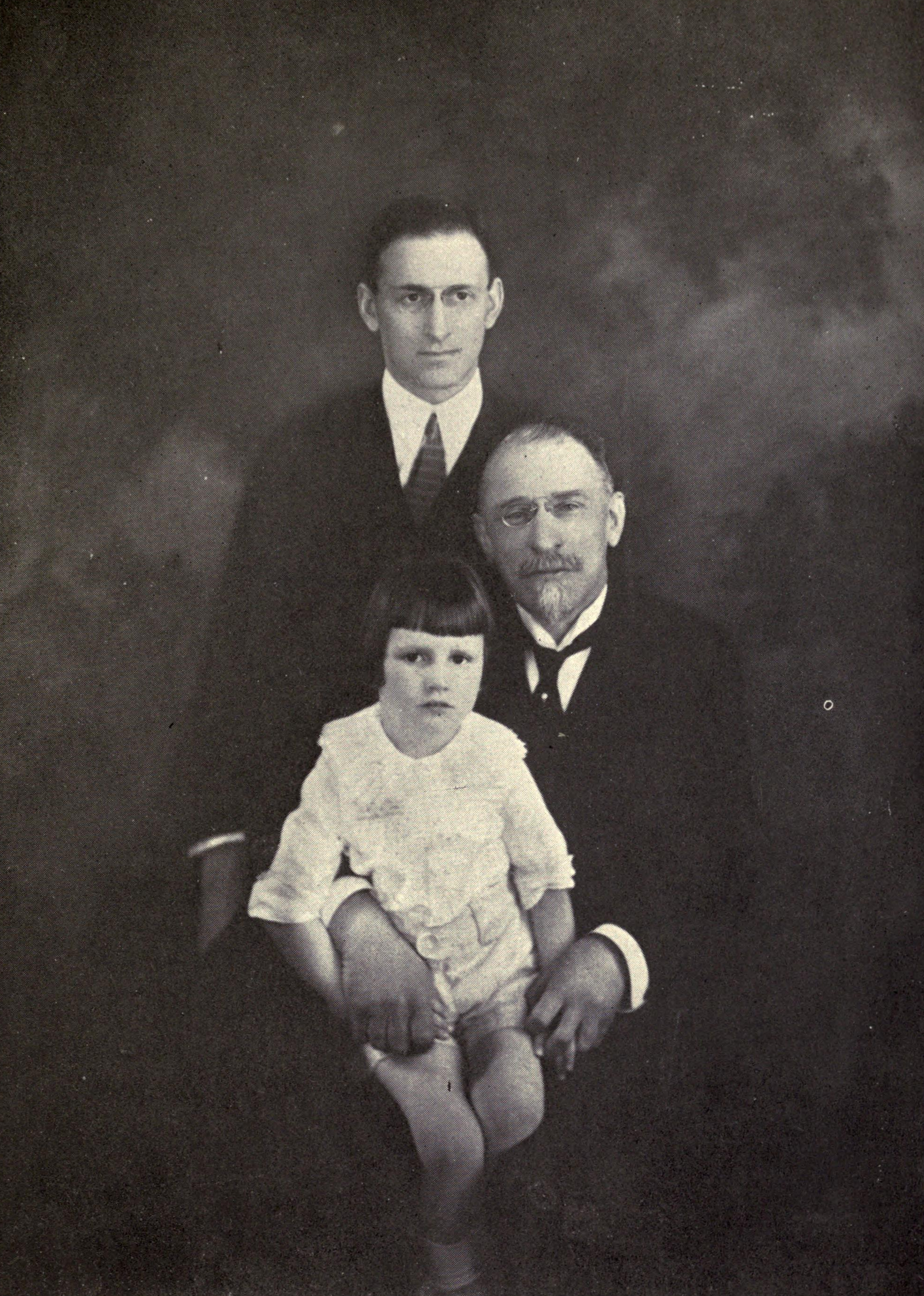
Morgenthau with his father Henry Jr. and grandfather Henry Sr. c. 1922

Henry Morgenthau III was the son of Elinor (née Fatman), granddaughter of Mayer Lehman, a co-founder of Lehman Brothers and Henry Morgenthau Jr., who was Franklin D. Roosevelt's U.S. Secretary of the Treasury. He was born into an ethnically Jewish family. He was a grandson of US Ambassador Henry Morgenthau Sr. and grandnephew of New York Governor and Senator Herbert H. Lehman. He was the brother of former New York County District Attorney Robert M. Morgenthau, as well as of Joan Elizabeth Morgenthau Hirschhorn (October 9, 1922 – October 1, 2012), who was professor of clinical pediatrics and preventive medicine and the associate dean for student affairs at Mount Sinai School of Medicine. A cousin was the American historian Barbara Tuchman.

== Early life and education ==
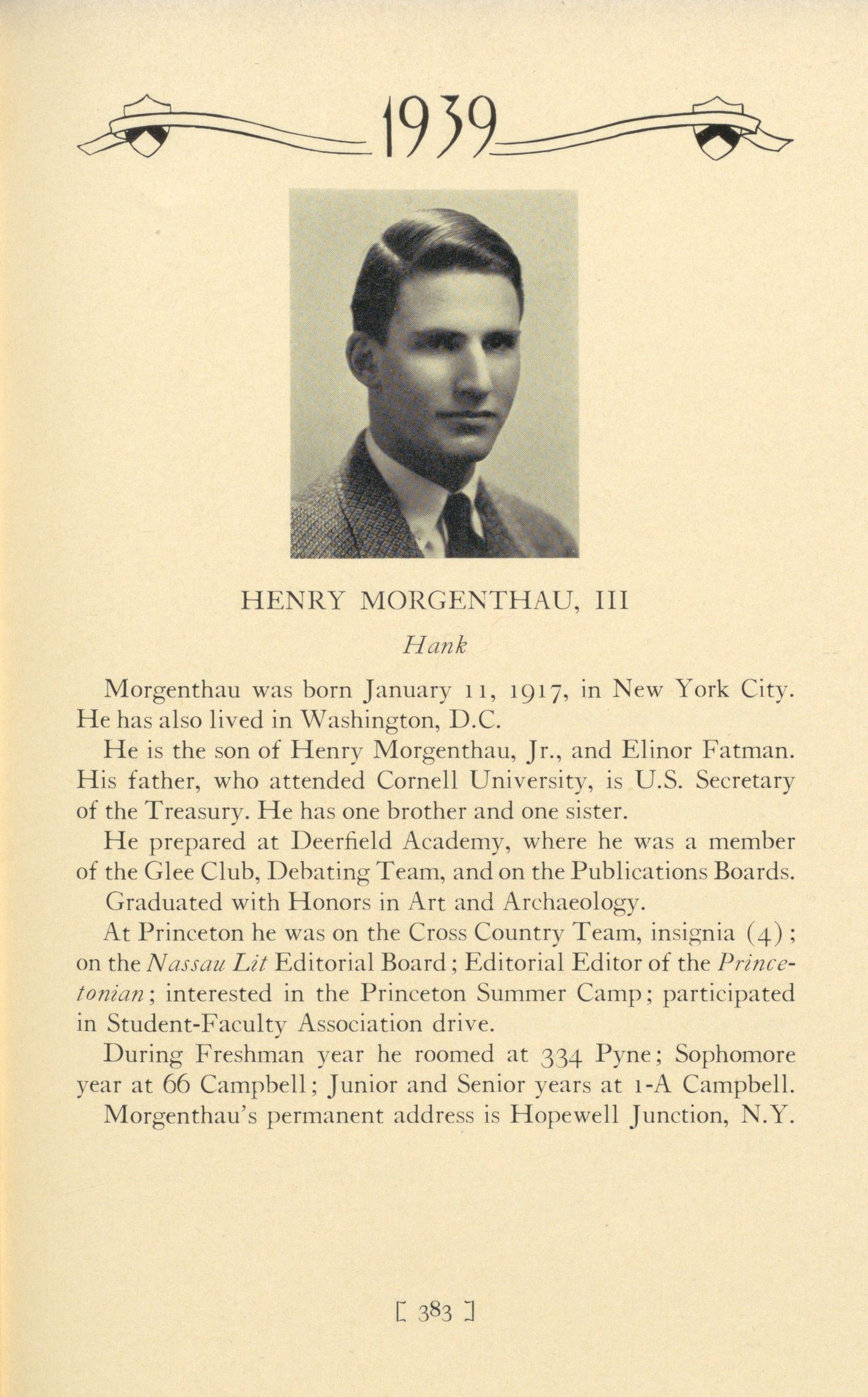
Morgenthau in the Princeton University yearbook, 1939

He graduated from Deerfield Academy in 1935 and Princeton University in 1939. During his time at university, he ran on the cross country team, worked on Theatre Intime, and was an editorial-board member of the Daily Princetonian. Despite his family's social stature, Morgenthau was frozen out of bicker (excluded from Eating club membership) as a sophomore in 1937, along with four of the other 11 Jewish students in the class.

== Career ==
During World War II, Morgenthau served in the US Army. From 1945, he was involved in the television business, at various times working as an author, producer and manager for the larger national institutions like NBC, CBS and ABC, while serving as President of Gannaway-Morgenthau Productions, Inc. From 1955 to 1977, Morgenthau was a chief producer of WGBH (Boston).

His shows at WGBH won Peabody, Emmy, United Press International, Educational Film Library Association, and Flaherty Film Festival awards. He also served as acting program manager at WYNC. Morgenthau served as a vice president of the Eleanor Roosevelt Institute. He also was a manager of the Morse Communication Center at Brandeis University.

Morgenthau III was producer of Prospects of Mankind with Eleanor Roosevelt (1959), The Negro and the American Promise (1963), and Conversation with Svetlana Alliluyeva (daughter of Stalin) (1967). He was a contributor to Screamers (2006 film) and story editor of A Tale of Two Christmases (December 21, 1952).

== Authorship ==
He wrote Mostly Morgenthaus: A Family History (1991), focused on several patriarchs: The first Morgenthau of record, Moses (1773–1834), impoverished teacher of Hebrew from Gleusdorf in Bavaria, who later became a ritual slaughterer married to a rabbi’s daughter, was required to take a family name when the Jews of Bavaria were granted citizenship in 1813. Waiting in line at city hall in the predawn, he looked at the damp ground and decided to call himself Morgen Tau ("morning dew'' in German). His and Brunhilda Morgenthau's son, Lazarus (1815–1897) was making nicotine-free cigars, candy from pine needles, tongue scrapers, and gum-label machines. Married in 1843 to Seline Babette Guggenheim, he moved to Mannheim and opened a cigar manufactory, a business that grew rapidly when his brother Max (also called Mengo) wrote from California in 1849 suggesting he ship his cigars to the American market. Lazarus's success had been extraordinary, but the luck that had followed him could not prevent the business failure that followed the rise of protective tariffs in the United States when war broke out there in 1861. Financially overextended, Lazarus moved to New York in 1866, where his fortunes plummeted further. Lazarus's ninth child, Henry Sr. (1856–1946), saw his mission as restoring the family to its rightful position. As Wilson's ambassador to the Ottoman Empire (Turkey) during the crucial years before and during World War I, he supported the Jews in Palestine and heroically rescued Armenians persecuted by the Turks. Henry Jr. (1891–1967) was a close friend of both Eleanor and Franklin Roosevelt, FDR's Secretary of the Treasury and leader of U.S. efforts on behalf of Holocaust survivors. In his book Henry Morgenthau III casts doubt on the alleged Communist associations of his father's Treasury aide Harry Dexter White, whom Whitaker Chambers accused of being a Soviet spy and conspirator.

In 2016, at the age of 99, Morgenthau III published his first book of poetry entitled "A Sunday in Purgatory."

== Awards ==
On May 9, 2015, at Marriott Marques Hotel in Washington, D.C., during the National Commemoration of the Armenian genocide Centennial Reception And Award Banquet, Catholicos Karekin II presented an award to Henry Morgenthau III.

== Personal life and death ==
Henry Morgenthau III was an observant Jew who rediscovered his religion after his marriage to Ruth Schachter in 1962. Ruth died in 2006. They had three children together: Henry (Ben) Morgenthau (born 1964), cinematographer Kramer Morgenthau (born 1966) and Sarah Elinor Morgenthau Wessel (born 1963). Morgenthau turned 100 on January 11, 2017. He celebrated the occasion in Washington, D.C., with 35 relatives and friends. He had six grandchildren. Henry Morgenthau III died on July 10, 2018, at the age of 101.
