= Police Athletic League of New York City =

Youth organization in New York City

Police Athletic League, Inc.
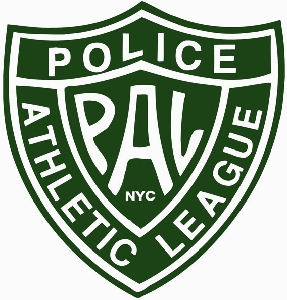
- Logo since 1922
- Founded: 1914
- Purpose: Youth development for inner-city children and teenagers
- Location: New York City
- Region served: Brooklyn, Bronx, Queens, Manhattan, Staten Island
- Method: Donations
- Key people: Frederick J. Watts, Executive Director
- Website: www.palnyc.org

The Police Athletic League (PAL) is an independent, nonprofit youth development agency in New York City. PAL is funded by a combination of private donations and public funding sources and is a designated charity of the New York City Police Department (NYPD). Robert M. Morgenthau, the late former New York County District Attorney, served as chairman of the board of directors beginning in 1963. PAL is open to all New York City children.

== History ==
The historical relationship between PAL and the NYPD is the result of a more than a century-old working relationship between law enforcement officials and civilian leaders. PAL was co-founded in 1914 by NYPD Police Commissioner Arthur Woods, who began Play Streets, and NYPD Police Captain John Sweeney, the founder of the Junior Police Clubs in Manhattan's Lower East Side. By 1917, the program was operating in 32 NYPD precincts.

The two programs were eventually combined to become the Police Athletic League of New York City. From 1914 to 1959, PAL was led by high-ranking NYPD officials. Since 1960, PAL has been managed by civilian Executive Directors, who have continued the tradition of cops helping kids helping communities.

== Programs and services ==
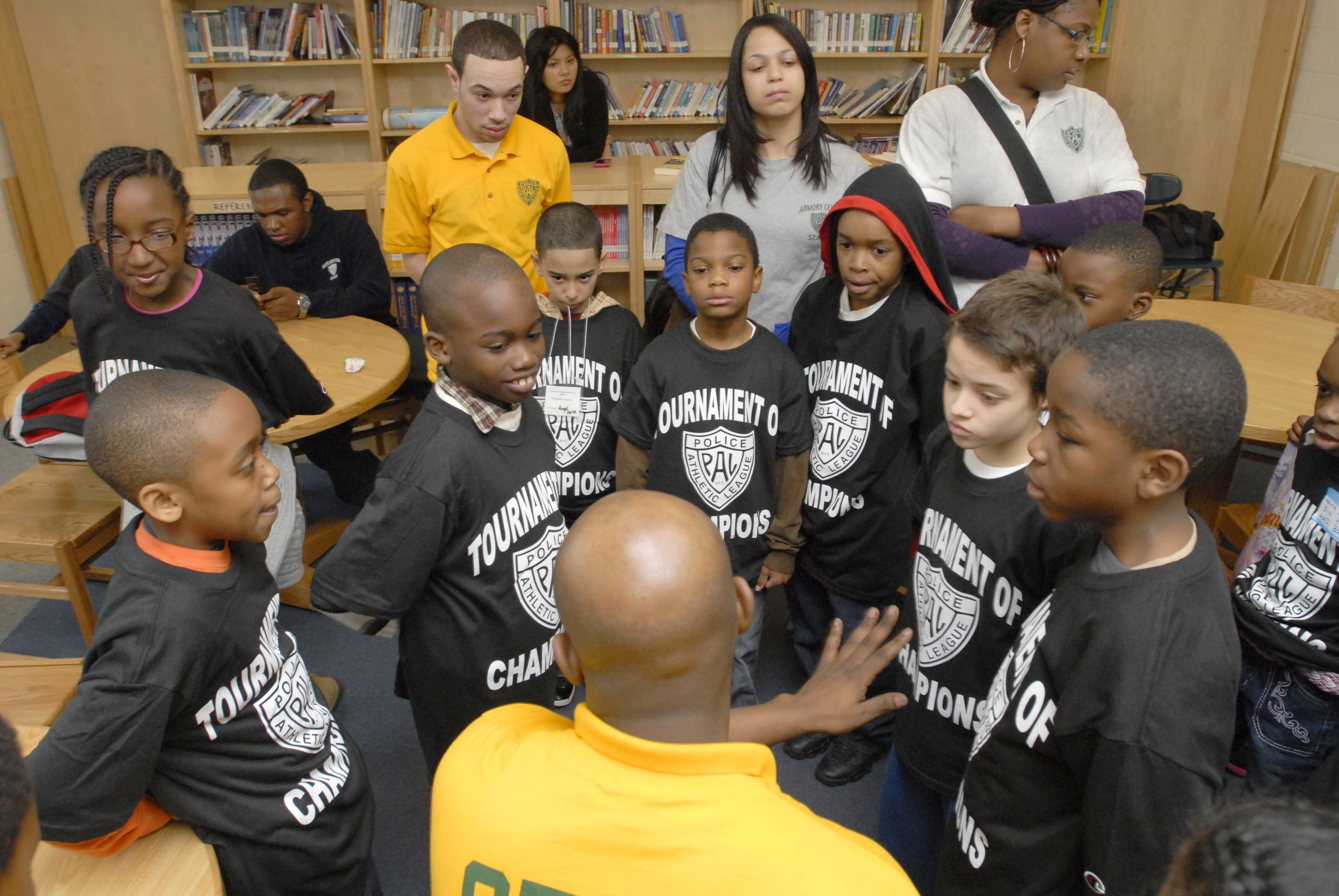
Math and spelling competitions at the annual Tournament of Champions

PAL offers a variety of services to city kids confronted by high risk factors in the neighborhoods with higher crime rates. Key programs include Head Start, After-School, Play Streets, Summer Day Camps, Truancy Prevention, Youthlink (family court probation supervision), Cops and Kids Sports, Summer Youth Employment, and Junior Police. Kids in grades K to 8 are served by a three-part after-school curriculum—PAL SMARTS, PAL ARTS and PAL FIT—that reinforces daily school lessons and academic achievement.

PAL works with NYPD to install Play Street sites on city streets, parks and schoolyards; these sites offer structured and adult-supervised activities like stickball, basketball, double Dutch, dance, board games and art projects. Play Streets are free of charge weekdays for seven weeks each summer. In addition, PAL operates Summer Day Camps for children grades K to 8, which provide activities such as literacy activities, arts projects, community service, sports and recreation and a citywide Cultural Day event.

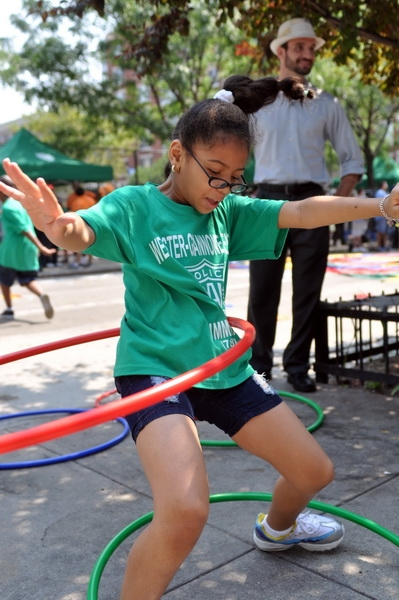
Young girl hula hoops at a Play Streets

PAL provides organized co-ed sports leagues for 14,000 New York City children, who are involved in sports such as basketball, flag football, baseball, volleyball and softball. Furthermore, over 825 NYPD officers and 2,500 PAL kids play on Cops & Kids sports teams, which are intended to create mutual respect between cops and kids.

PAL operates Mobile Teen Centers in neighborhoods that have requested PAL's presence. PAL also provides Evening Teen programs at its regular full-time centers. provide sports, recreation, life skills rap sessions, and crime prevention workshops. The organization operates two workforce development programs—Summer Youth Employment and In-School Training & Employment Program, where teenagers can receive volunteer internships and summer jobs. There is also a Juvenile Justice and Re-Entry Services Program to addresses New York City's high school dropout rate.

PAL Head Start programs serve 470 children, ages 3–5, with education, social services, health, mental health, nutrition and parental involvement. PAL Daycare serves another 390 children, ages 2–5. The programs are staffed with Early Education professionals who provide early learning experiences for the children coupled with dance and music programs, as well as provide meals to the kids.

== Relationship with NYPD ==
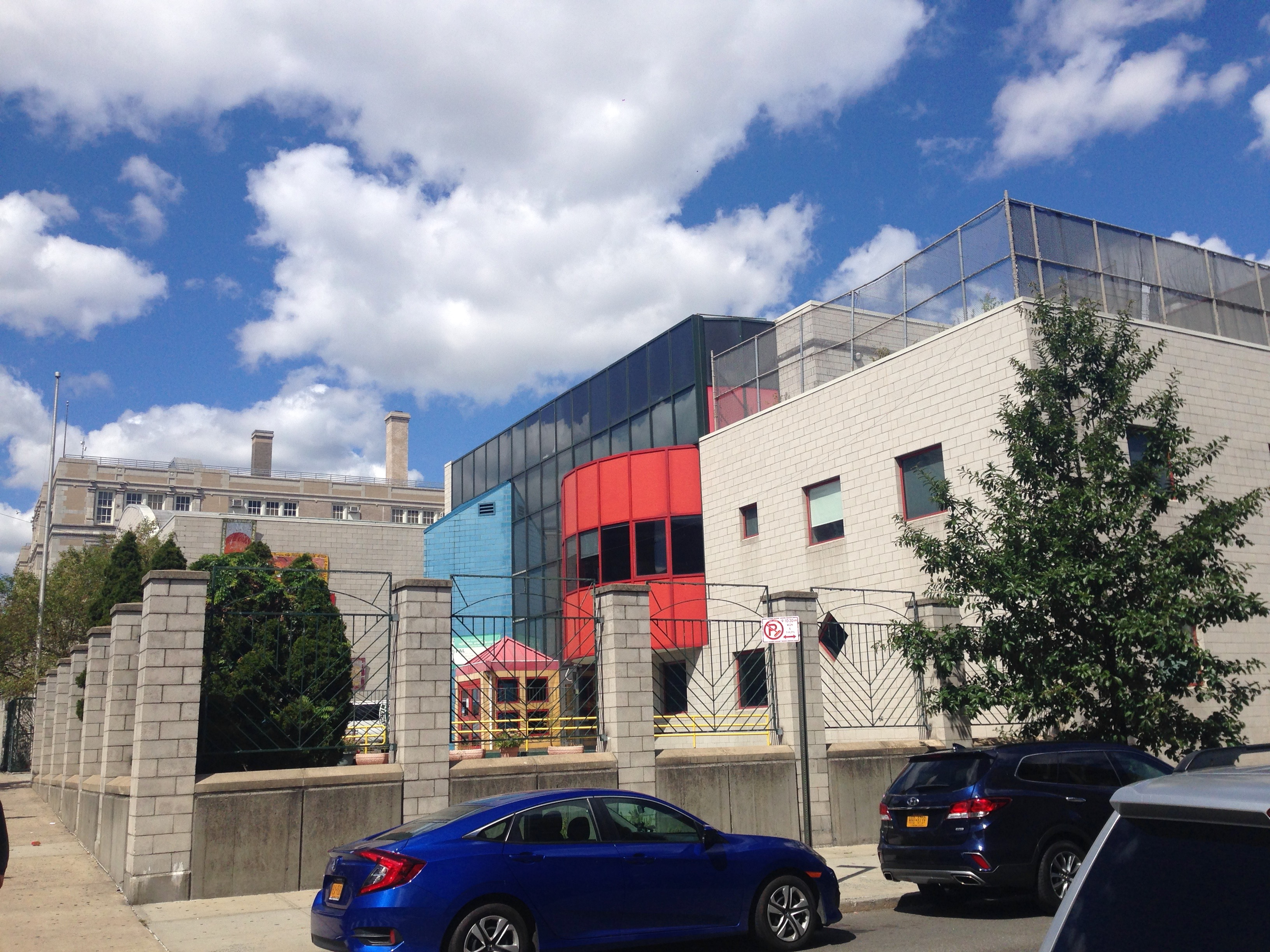
Police Athletic League of New York City in Longwood, Bronx

The NYPD and PAL identify neighborhoods where PAL designs programs that will have the greatest impact on the safety and development of kids. Police Commissioner William J. Bratton serves as Honorary President of the Board of Directors and is personally involved in PAL special events. Police Officers from NYPD Community Affairs work in tandem with PAL staff to develop and oversee community and recreational events and sports leagues. Junior Police Clubs are sponsored by NYPD officers who attend club meetings and lead community outings. These Clubs are a way for youths to learn volunteer community service, civic engagement and good citizenship.

== Results ==
PAL has a strong research and evaluation initiative anchored by PALTRAX Software and PALSTAT that conducts biannual evaluations of programs and centers. This information is used to identify assets and risks and gauge program effectiveness. According to one study on the effect of PAL, 100% of high school seniors enrolled in In-School Training and Employment Program graduated on time and 90% went on to enroll in college. For younger kids in PAL SMARTS classes, 97% who started with the real fear of being sent back a grade were, instead, promoted to the next grade.
