= Fishkill Farms =

Farm in East Fishkill, New York

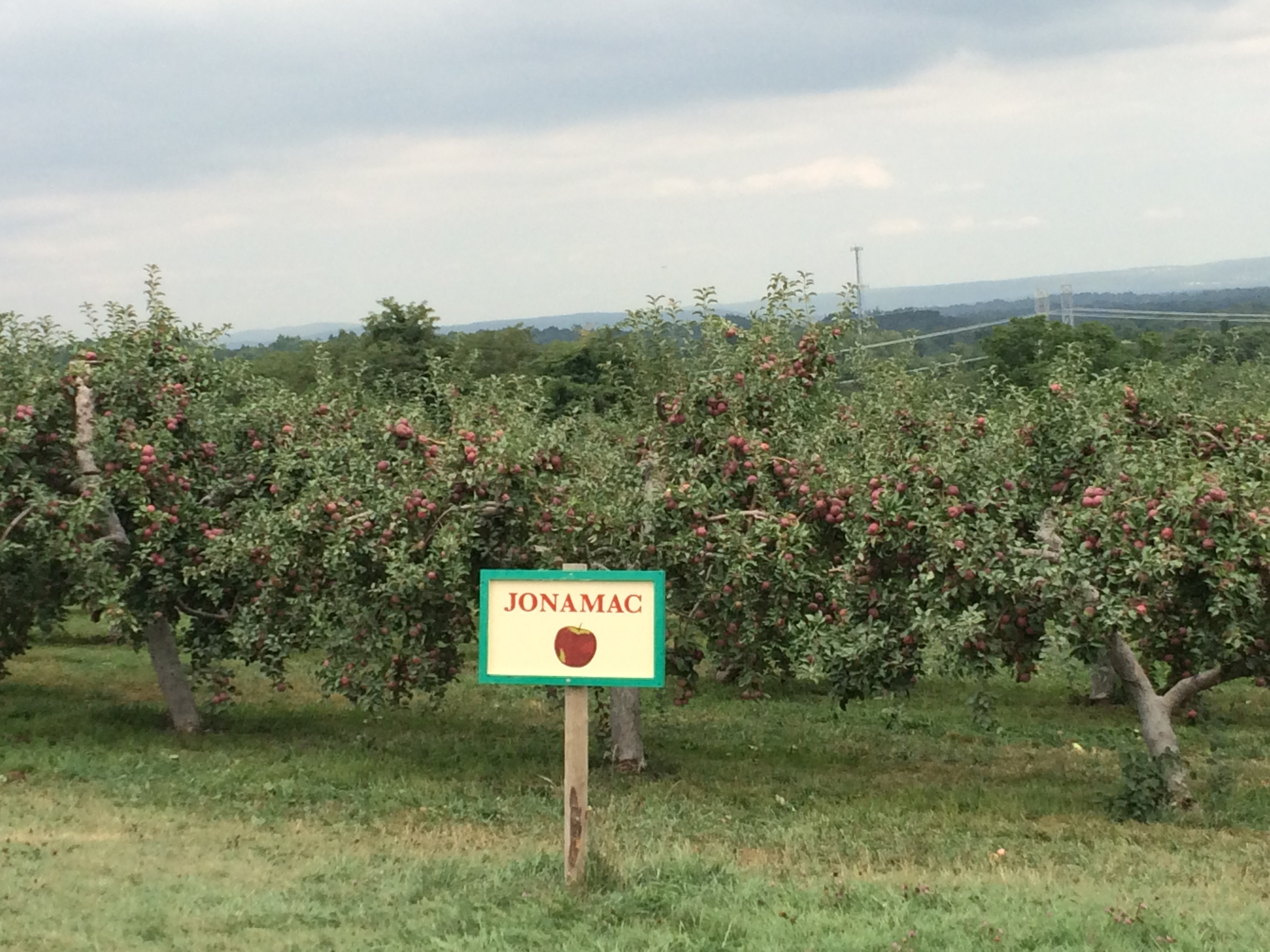
- Apple trees at Fishkill Farms
- Town/City: East Fishkill
- State: New York
- Established: 1914
- Area: 130 acres (530,000 m^{2})
- Produces: Fruits and vegetables

Fishkill Farms is a farm located in East Fishkill in Dutchess County, New York.

It is of historic significance primarily because its founder Henry Morgenthau, Jr. and his wife, Elinor Morgenthau were close and enduring family friends of Franklin D. Roosevelt and Eleanor Roosevelt. Eleanor Roosevelt wrote, "They were our neighbors in the country and we enjoyed them as neighbors and friends before politics and work for different social aims came into our relationship. It is interesting to know that my husband never held a political office from the time of his governorship of New York state without having Henry Morgenthau, Jr., in some way in his official family. My husband no doubt often treated Henry as a younger brother..." The Morgenthau's country home at Hopewell Junction was located in Dutchess County only ten miles southeast of Hyde Park, where the Roosevelts lived. The Morgenthaus and the Roosevelts had much in common: sharing a similar upper-class background, a similar political outlook and a common interest in farming. FDR and Morgenthau were said to have engaged in a neighborly rivalry over the cultivation of squash.

Fishkill Farms is currently an apple orchard and small-scale business, one of the Hudson Valley's oldest apple orchards. In a May 6, 1914 letter to his father, Henry Morgenthau, Sr., who was serving as Ambassador to Turkey in the Wilson administration, Morgenthau wrote, "I have undertaken to set out 1,400 fruit trees (apple trees) which cover some 47-48 acres." Organic Authority LLC named Fishkill Farms its 2010 "top pick" apple farm in the New York City area.

== History ==
Fishkill Farms was acquired by Henry Morgenthau, Jr in the fall of 1913 at the age of twenty-two. Historian John Morton Blum said that the farm was several hundred acres (many of them orchard) that became Morgenthau's home and vocation. FDR and Morgenthau first met at a Dutchess County political luncheon held at Hyde Park in 1915. Roosevelt immediately took to Henry saying, He is an awfully nice fellow, and one who will be a tremendous asset to us in the county." Although FDR was then serving as Assistant Secretary of the Navy in the Wilson administration, "he kept a firm grip on the most minute functions of the Dutchess County Democratic organization." Roosevelt tried to persuade Morgenthau to run for Sheriff but Morgenthau declined indicating that he intended to devote most of his time to running his farm. Even so, FDR remained in touch with Henry, Jr. and Eleanor Roosevelt and Elinor Morgenthau also became close friends. Roosevelt drew on Morgenthau's farming knowledge and agricultural connections when running for Governor of New York in 1928, which enabled FDR to pick-up an extraordinary number of votes in normally Republican areas. As Governor elect of New York, Roosevelt named Morgenthau Chairman of an Agricultural Advisory Commission, and most of the commission's recommendations were enacted into law. On his 50th birthday in 1932, FDR also celebrated his fond but teasing friendship with Morganthau with the following poem that was long displayed on a plaque in the farm store:

When Henry walks amid the fields

Each tulip adoration yields

And when he wanders past the trees

They clap applause with all the leaves

His agricultural skill and care

Prevent our fields from becoming bare

'Tis proper that all vegetation

Should praise the boss of conservation

Morgenthau joined the incoming Roosevelt administration when Roosevelt asked him to head Farm Credit Administration, which FDR had created by sending Congress an Executive order on March 27, 1933. Morgenthau became Secretary of the Treasury in January 1934 after William H. Woodin resigned for health reasons. Morgenthau served as Treasury Secretary from January 1934-July 1945.

There can be little doubt that Fishkill Farms had a special place in FDR's heart: With his second term drawing to a close and the world situation deteriorating FDR longed to retire to Dutchess County. While having dinner with the Morgenthau's at Mrs. Morgenthau's D.C. residence on the evening of April 17, 1940 FDR proposed a toast saying, "Next year's wedding anniversary will be at Fish Kill Farms," and Morgenthau noted that he repeated it two or three times. Morgenthau wrote that he thought FDR was sincere when he said it, but he suspected events would not permit it because that same evening Roosevelt also had described his plans to form a National Cabinet, which implied he was making preparations for a third term. Still, in less stressful times FDR was able to find relaxation at the Morgenthau farm. On August 9, 1936, the New York Times reported that the annual clambake at the Morgenthau farm "has become one of the high points of the Summers President Roosevelt has spent here since becoming President." On August 8, 1936, FDR sought relaxation at the informal annual clambake given in his honor by the Morgenthau's, after having been engaged in political conferences all week at his Hyde Park house. FDR arrived at the Morgenthau's farm in his new touring car. He joined some sixty guests, including many Dutchess county residents, that were seated "at tables on a rolling lawn beneath a great oak tree." Each guest received a large steaming canvass bag containing clams, chicken, and fish, that had been all cooked together. Corn on the cobb, salad, and coleslaw completed the meal. The clambake at the Morgenthau's farm was said to be carrying-out a century old Dutchess county tradition. The farm has been handed down through family members, including former Manhattan District Attorney Robert M. Morgenthau. The farm is now run by his son, Joshua Morgenthau.

The farm originally produced apples, chickens, potatoes, corn, dairy and likely more. After being held up by a wet spring, in a May 24, 1914 letter Morgenthau predicted "we are going to have a very good season." He reported that ten days without rain had enabled him to have practically all his potatoes in and about half his corn. Dairy farming ceased during World War II when hired help was hard to find. In 1980, a hailstorm damaged the apples and rendered them unsellable to wholesale distributors so the orchard was opened up to the local public for U-pick harvesting. The farm has been doing U-pick ever since.

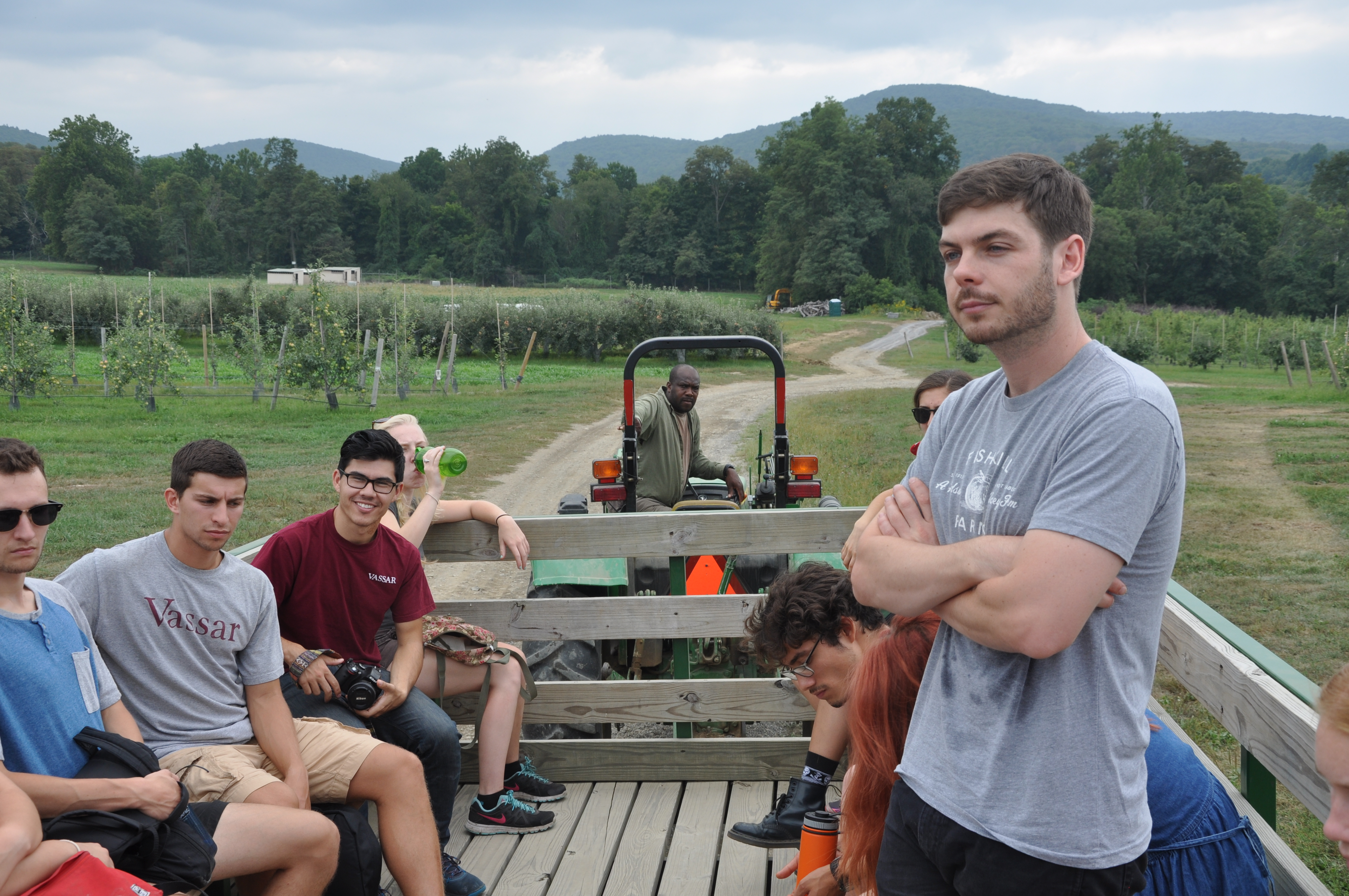
Josh Morgenthau leads students on a tour of Fishkill Farms

== Services ==
Fishkill Farms's 130-acre property offers U-pick services for produce including blueberries, blackberries, cherries, peaches, nectarines, pears and vegetables. Pasture-raised hens also produce eggs for the farm. It also sells produce in Brooklyn farmers' markets and an order-fulfillment service called Good Eggs. The farm offers community-supported agriculture shares for Hudson Valley residents. Numerous events such as weddings and private affairs are hosted on site, including a recent Autumn Orchard Dinner which was reported upon by the gourmet aficionado Williams Sonoma.

== Sustainability ==
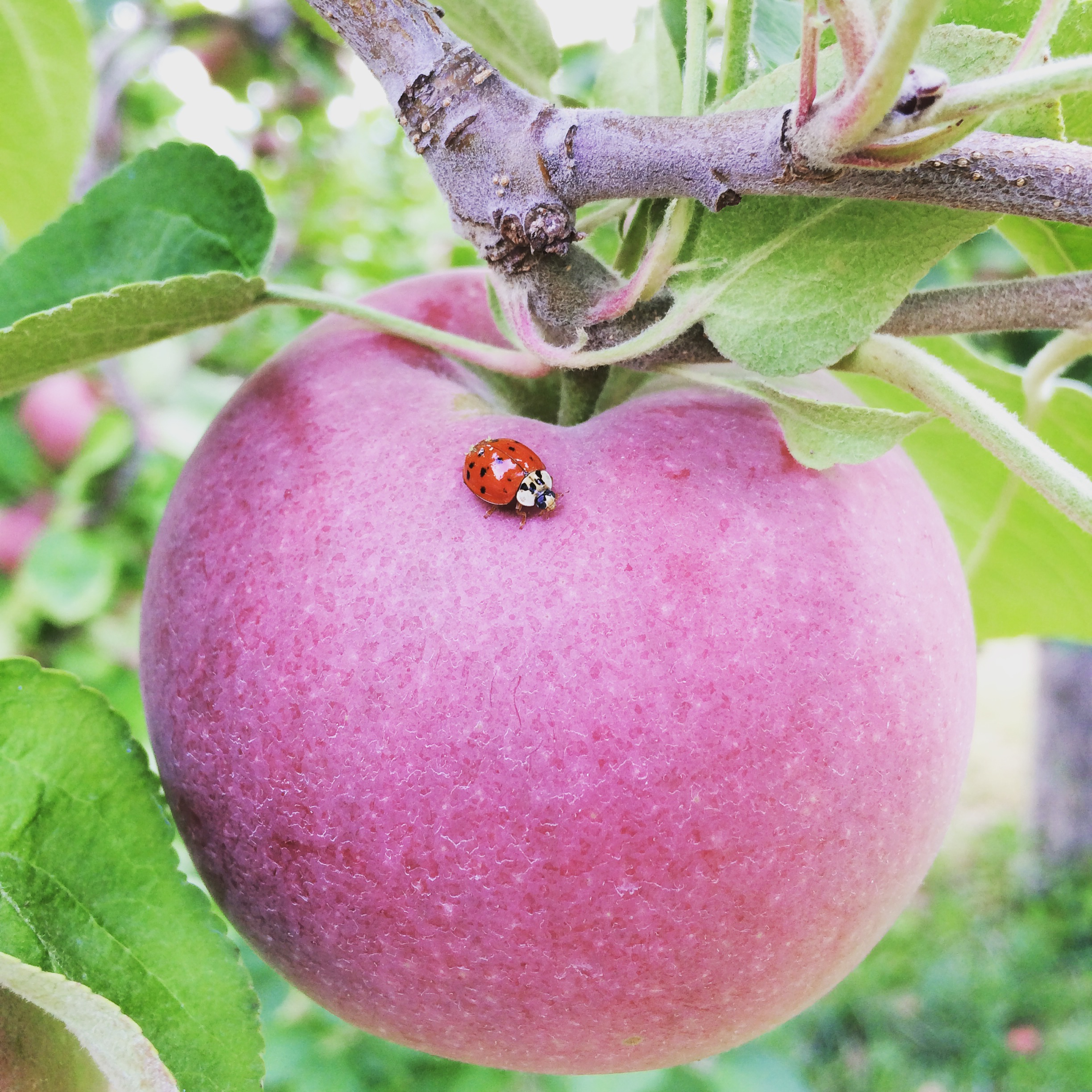
An apple from one of Fishkill's historic orchards

Farming practices at Fishkill operate with the goal of sustainability and carbon neutrality in mind, with an effort to grow as many foods as possible organically. The farm intends to consciously select crop varieties which are most suited to the effects of climate change over the next twenty years.
