= Helen Morgenthau Fox =

American botanist and author (1884–1974)

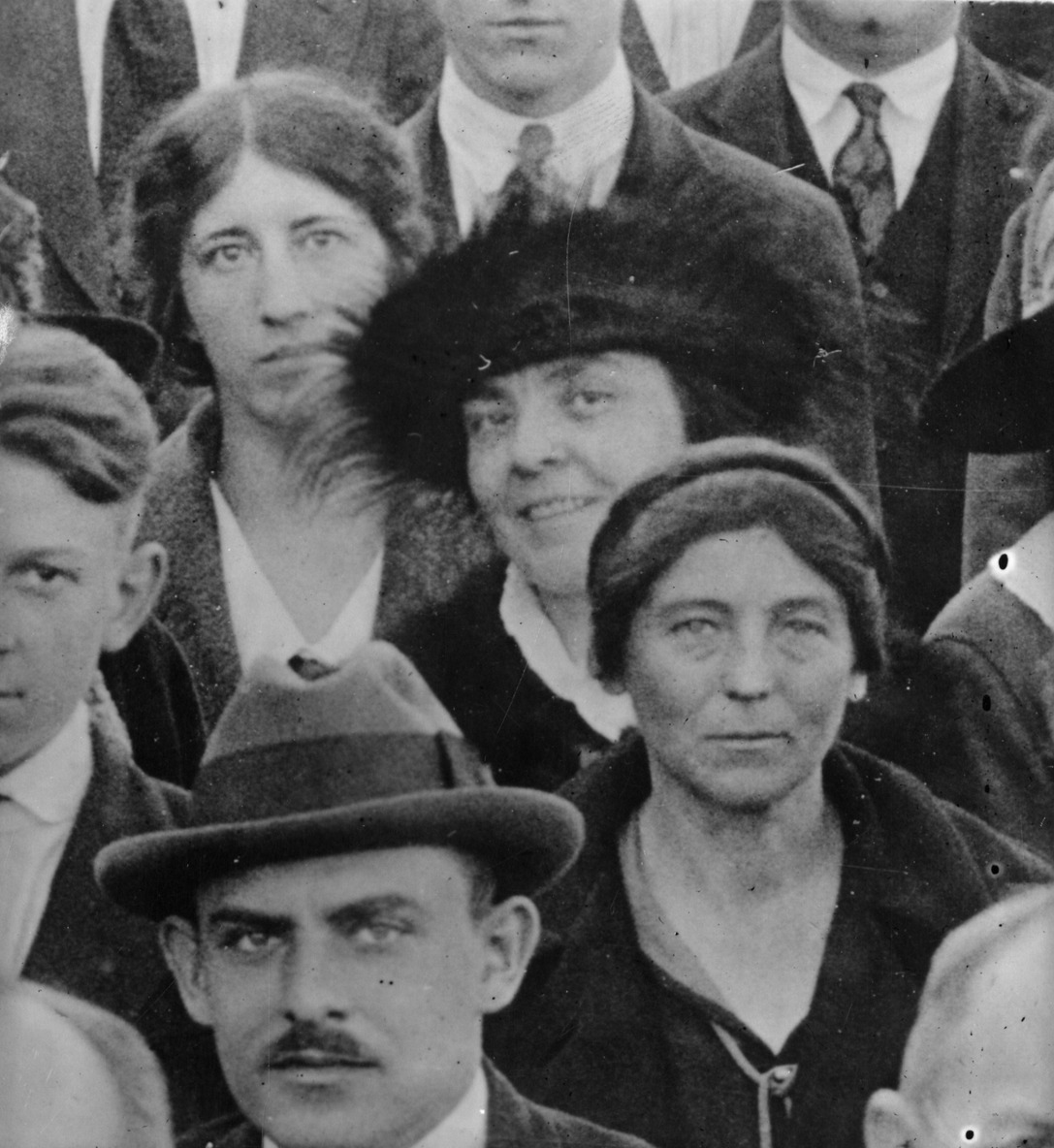
- Fox (center) with Agnes J. Quirk (left) and Florence Hedges
- Born: Helen Morgenthau; May 27, 1884; New York City, U.S.
- Died: January 14, 1974 (aged 89); Mount Kisco, New York, U.S.
- Spouse: Mortimer J. Fox (m. 1906)
- Children: Henry Morgenthau Fox; Mortimer J. Jr.; Lucius R
- Parents: Henry Morgenthau Sr.; Josephine Sykes
- Relatives: Henry Morgenthau Jr. (brother); Henry Morgenthau III (nephew); Robert M. Morgenthau (nephew); Barbara W. Tuchman (niece); Anne W. Simon (niece)
- Scientific career
- Fields: Botany

Helen Morgenthau Fox (née Morgenthau; May 27, 1884 – January 13, 1974) was an American botanist and author of popular gardening books.

== Biography ==
Helen Morgenthau Fox was born in New York City. She was Jewish through her patrilineal roots. Her father was United States Ambassador to Turkey Henry Morgenthau Sr., and her brother was Henry Morgenthau Jr. In 1905, Fox graduated from Vassar College before studying at the New York Botanical Garden (NYBG) She married architect, banker and landscape artist Mortimer J. Fox in 1906. During her adult life, she lived in Bedford, New York on a 20-acre property named High Low Farm.

Fox wrote a variety of gardening books from 1927 to 1973 and wrote articles for The New York Times. In 1949, she translated French naturalist and missionary, Abbe David's journals from his trip to China in 1866 to 1869. In 1934, Fox helped design and guide the herb garden at The Cloisters in Manhattan. She lectured extensively on gardening around the world, speaking for the United States Department of Agriculture and at garden clubs and universities. Fox was also featured on radio and television programs.

She was a member of the advisory council of the New York Botanical Garden, honorary vice president of the New York Horticultural Society, corresponding member of the Royal Horticultural Society, trustee of the Rock Garden Society of America and director emeritus of the American Horticultural Society. She had served on the board of the Bellevue Hospital School of Nursing and was active in the adult education program of the Westchester County Home Bureau.

Fox died at the age of 89. in Mount Kisco, New York.

== Selected publications ==
- Gardens and Gardening, a Selected List of Books (1927)
- Garden Cinderellas: How to Grow Lilies in the Garden (1928)
- Patio Gardens (1929)
- What Spain Can Teach Us About Gardening (1929)
- Jean C. N. Forestier (1931)
- Gardens to See in Travels Abroad (1931)
- More Gardens To See When Traveling Abroad (1931)
- Gardens in Hawaii (1931)
- Gardening with Herbs for Flavor and Fragrance (1933)
- Low Growing Native American Flowering Trees (1944)
- The Aging Garden (1948)
- Abbe David's Diary (1949)
- A visit to California Gardens and Gardeners (1957)
- André Le Nôtre, garden architect to kings (1962)
- Adventure in My Garden (1965)
- Gardening with Herbs for Flavor and Fragrance (1970 reprint of 1933 edition)
- Gardening for Good Eating (1943)
- Gardening for Good Eating (1973 reprint of 1943 edition)
- The Years in my Herb Garden (1953)
