= Robert Morgenthau =

American lawyer (1919–2019)

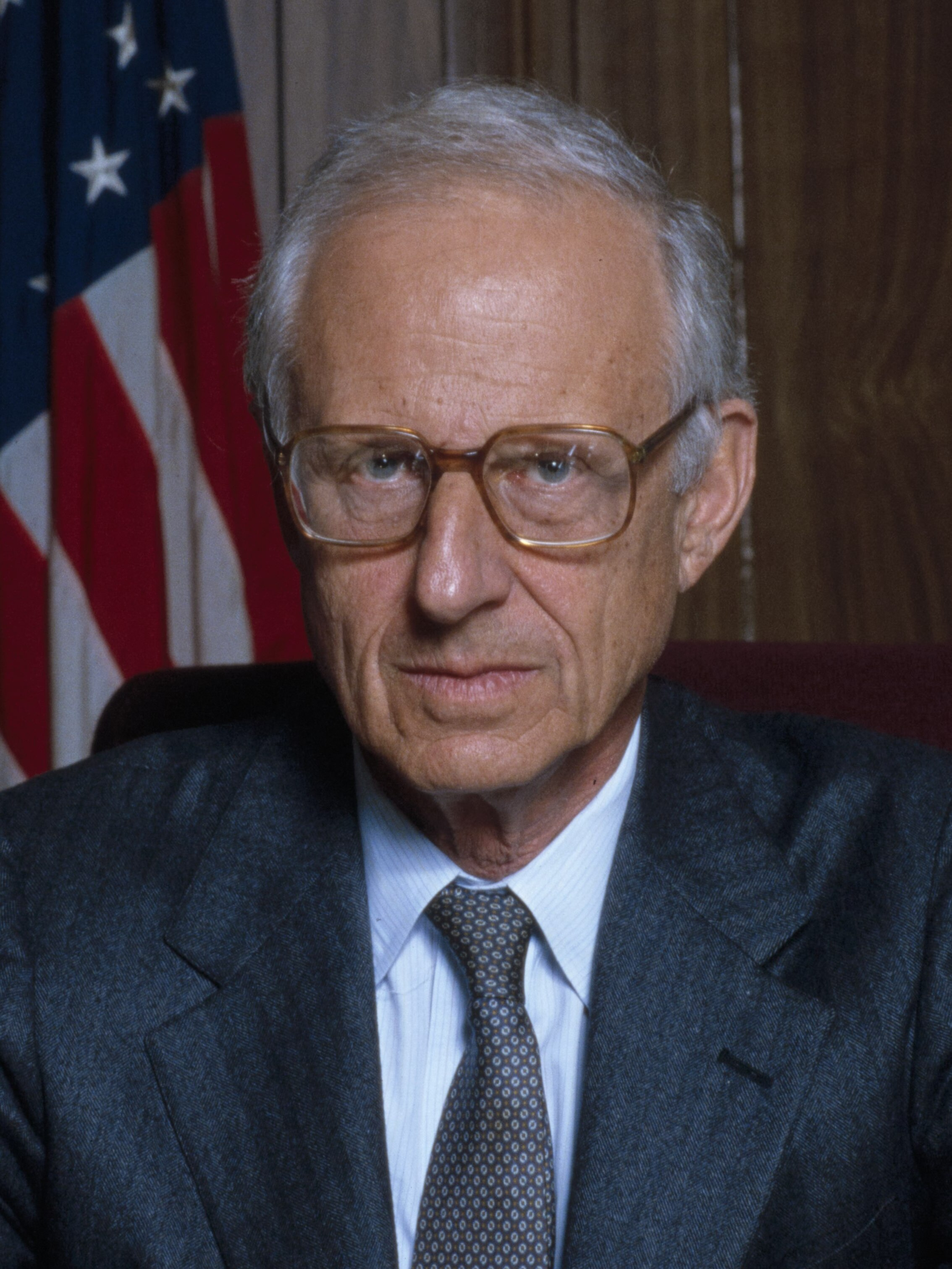
- Morgenthau in 1985

35th District Attorney of New York County
- In office January 1, 1975 – December 31, 2009
- Preceded by: Richard Kuh
- Succeeded by: Cyrus Vance Jr.

United States Attorney for the Southern District of New York
- In office December 4, 1962 – January 15, 1970
- President: John F. Kennedy; Lyndon B. Johnson; Richard Nixon
- Preceded by: Vincent L. Broderick (acting)
- Succeeded by: Whitney North Seymour Jr.
- In office April 18, 1961 – September 4, 1962
- President: John F. Kennedy
- Preceded by: Samuel Hazard Gillespie Jr.
- Succeeded by: Vincent L. Broderick (acting)

Personal details
- Born: Robert Morris Morgenthau; July 31, 1919 New York City, U.S.
- Died: July 21, 2019 (aged 99) New York City, U.S.
- Party: Democratic
- Spouses: Martha Pattridge (m. 1943; died 1972) Lucinda Franks (m. 1977)
- Children: 7
- Parents: Henry Morgenthau Jr.; Elinor Fatman
- Relatives: Henry Morgenthau III (brother); Henry Morgenthau Sr. (grandfather); Mayer Lehman (great-grandfather); Kramer Morgenthau (nephew); Helen Morgenthau Fox (aunt); Barbara W. Tuchman (cousin); Anne W. Simon (cousin)
- Education: Amherst College (BA); Yale University (LLB)

Military service
- Allegiance: United States
- Branch/service: United States Navy
- Years of service: 1940–1945
- Rank: Lieutenant Commander
- Unit: USS Winslow (DD-359); USS Lansdale (DD-426); USS Harry F. Bauer
- Battles/wars: World War II

Robert Morris Morgenthau (/ˈmɔːrɡənθɔː/ MORG-ən-thaw; July 31, 1919 – July 21, 2019) was an American lawyer. From 1975 until his retirement in 2009, he was the District Attorney for New York County (the borough of Manhattan), having previously served as United States Attorney for the Southern District of New York throughout much of the 1960s on the appointment of John F. Kennedy. At retirement, Morgenthau was the longest-serving district attorney in the history of the State of New York.

== Early life ==
Morgenthau was born in 1919 in New York City into a prominent Ashkenazi Jewish family that had emigrated from Baden in 1866. He was the son of Elinor (née Fatman) and Henry Morgenthau Jr., who served as the Secretary of the Treasury under Presidents Franklin Delano Roosevelt and Harry Truman from 1934 until 1945. His maternal great-grandfather was Mayer Lehman, a co-founder of Lehman Brothers. His grandfather, Henry Morgenthau Sr., was United States Ambassador to the Ottoman Empire during World War I. Before going into diplomatic service, Henry Morgenthau Sr. had made a fortune in real estate, and became a strong financial backer of Democratic President Woodrow Wilson. Morgenthau's paternal grandmother was born in Montgomery, Alabama.

From the earliest days, the Morgenthau family was well-connected politically. The family home was near Franklin Delano Roosevelt's Springwood Estate at Hyde Park, New York, and he grew up acquainted with the future President.

== World War II Navy combat service ==
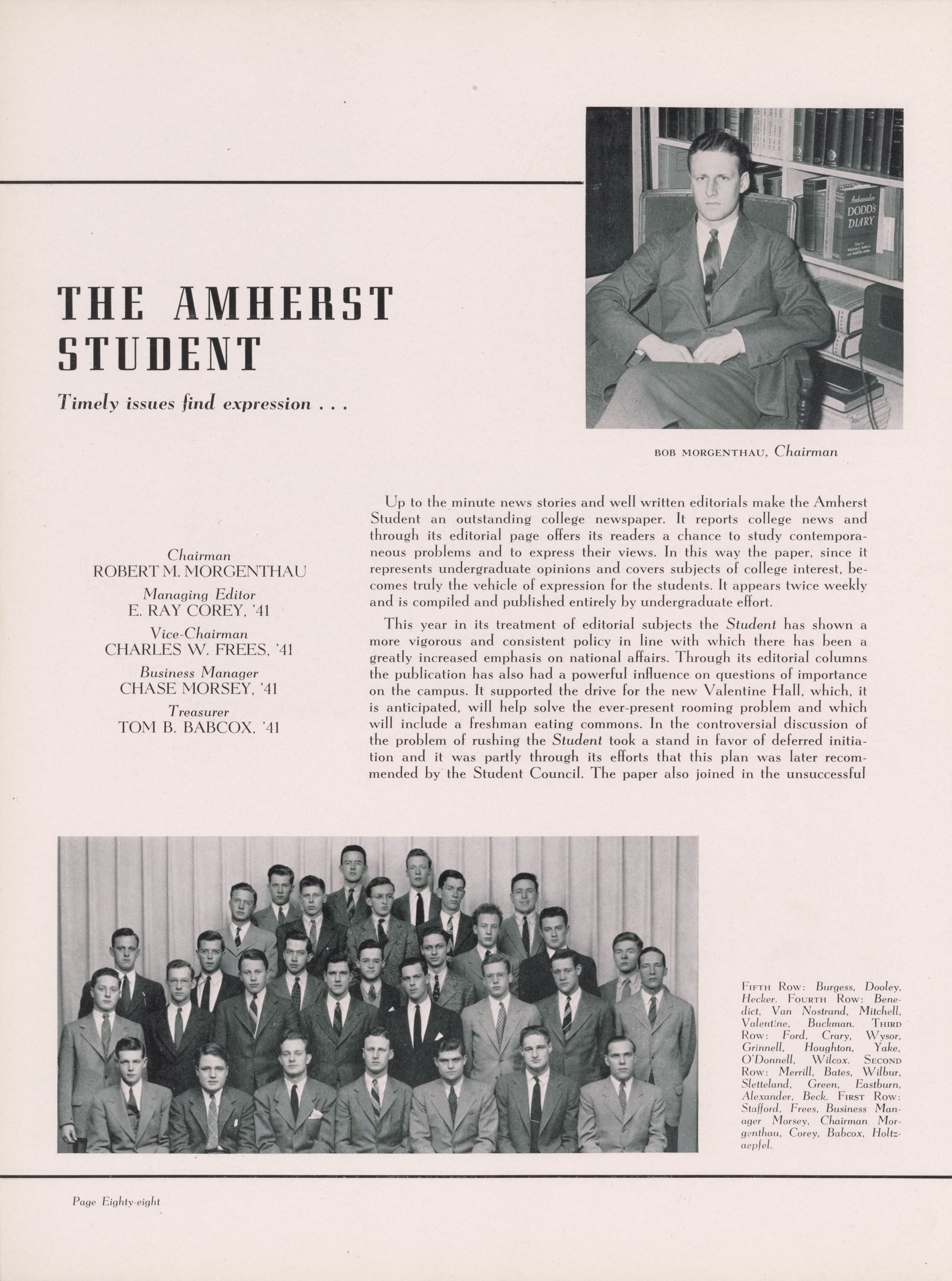
Morgenthau in the Amherst College yearbook, 1941

Morgenthau graduated from the New Lincoln School, Deerfield Academy, and Amherst College. In June 1940, while still in college, he enlisted in the United States Navy V-7 officers' training program that was open to students with three years of college, enabling them to earn commissions in the Naval Reserve. He took his 30-day midshipman cruise in July 1940, and spent his 21st birthday on the battleship USS Wyoming in Guantánamo Bay, Cuba. After graduating from college, he completed three months of midshipman training on board the USS Prairie State and was commissioned an ensign in the US Naval Reserve upon graduation. He was sent to communications school and thereafter attached to the destroyer USS Warrington for transfer to the Commander South Atlantic Force. Morgenthau was at the Boston Navy Yard when Pearl Harbor was attacked on December 7, 1941, forever recalling the message over the loudspeaker, "Japan is bombing Pearl Harbor. This is not a drill. Repeat: Japan is bombing Pearl Harbor." When Ensign Morgenthau reached the South Atlantic shortly after Pearl Harbor, he was attached to the destroyer leader USS Winslow, whose mission at the time was hunting for German blockade runners, raiders and submarines in the South Atlantic between Brazil and Africa. Morganthau was assigned as boarding officer and later wrote in a 2010 article for the U.S. Naval Institute "Answering the Call: Reflections of a 90-Day Wonder", that "The most dangerous part of this assignment involved the rope ladder that the suspicious ship lowered so that the Winslow boarding party could come aboard from its motor whaleboat. You had to grab the ladder at the top of a ten-foot swell, and then pull yourself up, making sure you climbed aboard before the whaleboat came back and broke your legs."

In mid-1943, Morganthau was transferred to another destroyer, USS Lansdale. Morgenthau survived the sinking of Lansdale on April 20, 1944, when a German aerial torpedo exploded at the forward stack. He and 233 other survivors were in the water for three hours and 47 men were lost. Age 24, bobbing for three hours in the frigid sea, Morgenthau later said that he made a pact with God: Save me and I'll devote my life to public service. "I was not in a very good bargaining position," Morgenthau quipped in an interview decades later. Morgenthau managed to get off the ship with a life vest. A screaming sailor thrashing in the water near him didn't and without hesitation Morgenthau gave his life vest to the man, saying wryly years later, "I think it was one of the stupidest things I ever did." Morgenthau described the lessons he learned from his experience as wartime X.O. on a navy destroyer in combat, "As executive officer, I learned about managing people and the importance of loyalty. All assignments and promotions must be on merit, not friendship. I learned to look for the best in everyone, not for their faults. I worked with men from all corners of the country, and all sorts of backgrounds, but I always tried to find common interests. I also learned never to trust an expert-described by some as 'an S.O.B. from out of town.' This view was reinforced by the misinformation about the bomb on board the Bauer. My experience on that ship taught me to spread the credit around rather than only rewarding the leadership-a principle that later helped keep morale high in the Manhattan district attorney's office. Lessons learned from surviving in hostile waters far from friendly skies gave me the experience and courage to prosecute cases without fear or favor."

The Lansdale survivors were picked up by the US Coast Guard crewed destroyer escort USS Menges. The third and final destroyer that Morgenthau was assigned to during World War II was the USS Harry F. Bauer. He attained the rank of lieutenant commander, and served as the executive officer of both the USS Lansdale and the USS Harry F. Bauer. Morganthau later said, "the day I arrived [for duty on Lansdale], the captain set down his rules. 'Everyone likes to give candy to children,' he said. 'but if this ship is to survive in a war zone, one of us has to be an S.O.B. I've decided that's you.' He dismissed me, saying, 'Good morning, Mr. S.O.B.'" Naval records indicate heroic action during the Battle of Iwo Jima — the Bauer was attacked by thirteen kamikazes, and survived a torpedo and dive bomber attack (both failed to detonate). Bauer amassed a stunning record during the war. She was credited with destroying 17 kamikaze planes, and the ship and all the members of her crew were awarded the Presidential Unit Citation. For Morganthau's Navy pre-war and wartime service aboard destroyers, he was awarded the American Defense Service Medal and all three U.S. campaign medals for World War II service, the American Campaign Medal, European–African–Middle Eastern Campaign Medal and the Asiatic–Pacific Campaign Medal. For his combat actions on destroyers Lansdale and Bauer, Morgenthau was awarded the Bronze Star Medal with Combat "V" device twice.

After the war, Morgenthau studied law, graduating from Yale Law School in 1948. He joined the New York law firm of Patterson, Belknap & Webb, becoming a partner in 1954.

== Career ==
=== U.S. Attorney ===
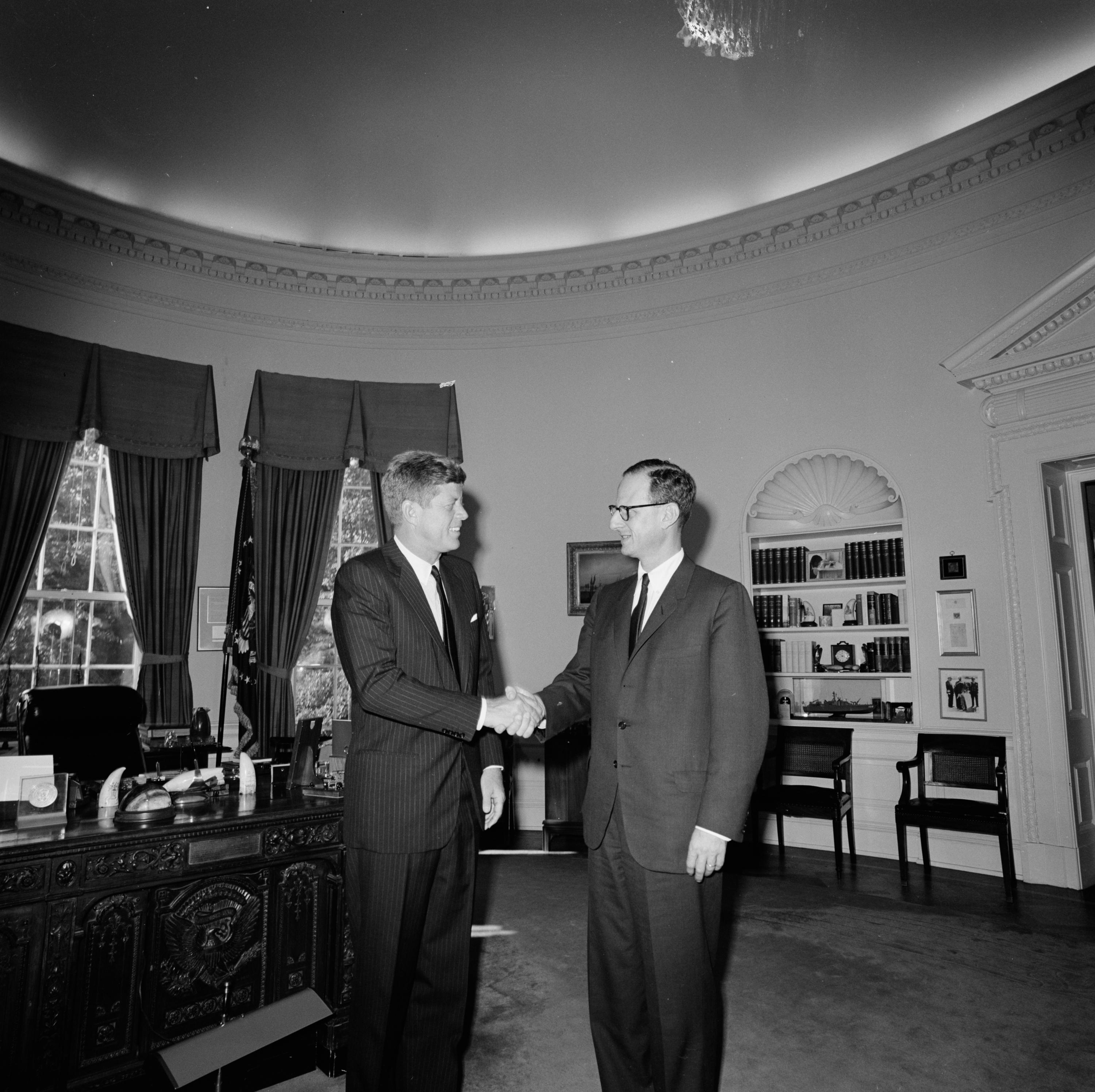
Morgenthau with President John F. Kennedy in 1962

In 1961, after twelve years of practicing corporate law, Morgenthau accepted an appointment from President John F. Kennedy as United States Attorney for the Southern District of New York. In 1962, he was the Democratic nominee for Governor of New York, and resigned his federal office. After his defeat by the incumbent Governor Nelson Rockefeller, Morgenthau was reappointed U.S. Attorney and served in that position for the remainder of the Kennedy and Johnson administrations. Morgenthau was eating lunch with Robert Kennedy when Kennedy received the news of his brother's murder in Dallas.

In January 1969, following the election of President Richard Nixon, Morgenthau remained in office, and for months resisted increasingly public pressures from the Nixon Administration to resign. He retained support from New York's liberal Republican U.S. Senators Jacob K. Javits and Charles Goodell. Morgenthau and his supporters claimed that replacing him would disrupt his work on vital cases, and that Nixon might be seeking to prevent Morgenthau from pursuing investigations that would prove embarrassing to the President or his friends. Nonetheless, Morgenthau's position became increasingly untenable. While well-regarded, he was after all a Democrat, thought to harbor political aspirations. Morgenthau's insistence on remaining in office seemed increasingly unreasonable. He was eventually forced out of office at the end of 1969. Republican Whitney North Seymour Jr. was appointed as U.S. Attorney for the Southern District of New York.

=== Return to politics ===
Afterward, Morgenthau served briefly in the reformist administration of Mayor John V. Lindsay as a deputy mayor, before resigning to seek the Democratic nomination for governor in 1970. Morgenthau was less successful in raising funds and developing support than were two other candidates, Arthur Goldberg and Howard Samuels, and within weeks, he withdrew from the race. Goldberg won the nomination, and was subsequently defeated by Rockefeller.

=== District Attorney of New York County ===
Morgenthau remained in private life until 1974, when he was elected to the office of District Attorney of New York County. This was a special election caused by the death of Frank Hogan, who had served as DA for more than 30 years. Morgenthau defeated Hogan's interim successor, Richard Kuh. He was elected to a full term in 1977, and was re-elected seven times. He was not opposed in a general election from 1985 to 2005.

Morgenthau was criticized in the press for his conduct in the wake of a major police corruption scandal. Eight men who were falsely arrested by New York City Transit Police officers in the scandal that shook the department were awarded more than $1 million in damages by a federal judge. One plaintiff, Ronald Yeadon, was a police officer. He was arrested twice while off duty and accused of sexually abusing a woman.

Morgenthau retained a national profile while serving in what was technically a local office, in part because of his dogged pursuit of white-collar crime. According to Gary Naftalis, a prominent Manhattan defense attorney who had been an assistant to Morgenthau in the 1960s, Morgenthau believed that prosecuting "crime in the suites" was every bit as important as prosecuting "crime in the streets".

At age 85 in 2005, Morgenthau announced that he would run for a ninth (eighth full) term as district attorney. For the first time in decades, he encountered a vigorous primary opponent – former state court judge Leslie Crocker Snyder. Snyder won the endorsement of The New York Times, which, like virtually all of the city's establishment, had long supported Morgenthau.

Morgenthau won the Democratic primary with 59% of the vote, to Snyder's 41%. In the general election, he was once again the candidate for all political parties in the election, having been nominated by the Democrats, Republicans, and the Working Families Party. Morgenthau won re-election with more than 99% of the vote.

=== Retirement ===
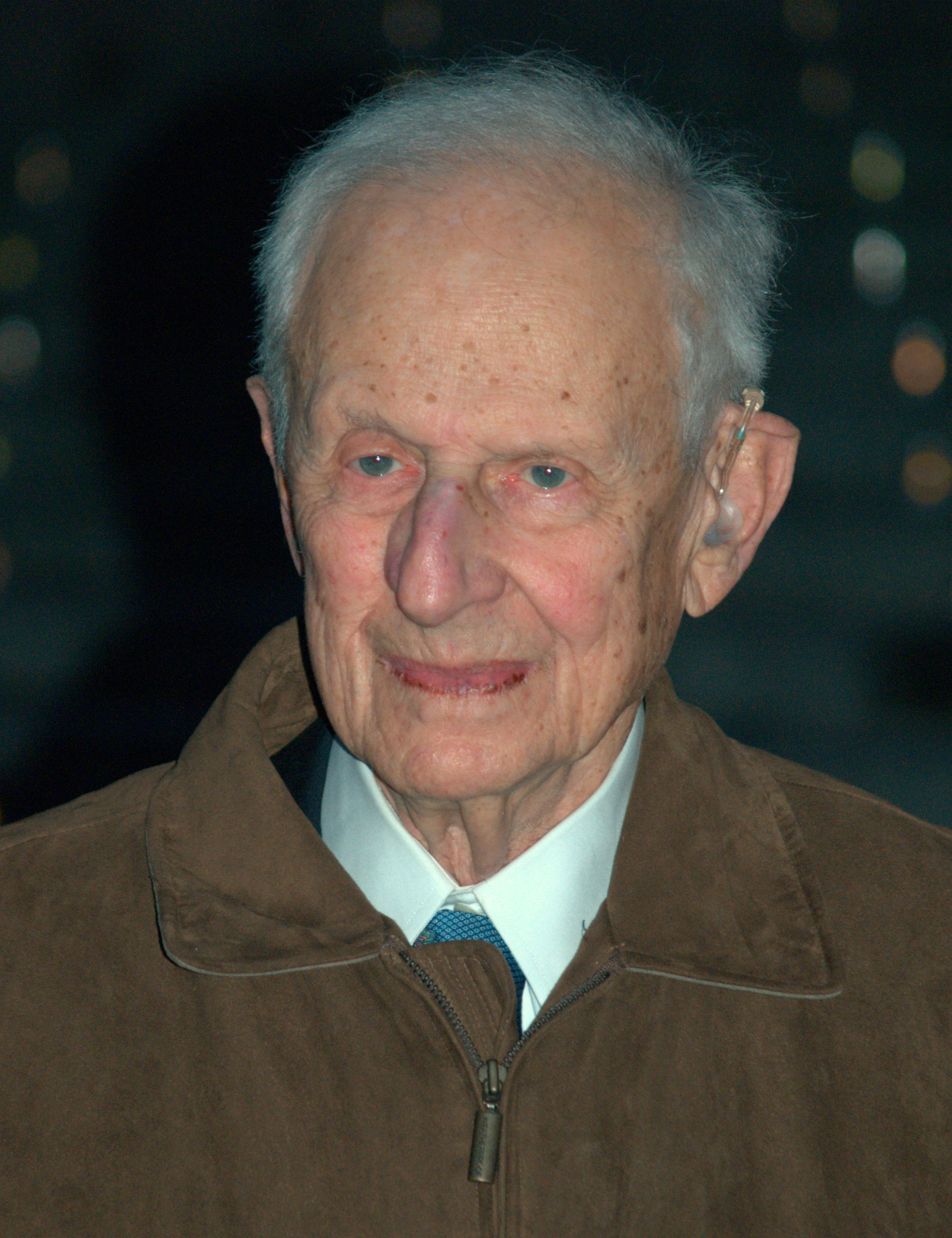
Morgenthau at the Tribeca Film Festival in 2009

On February 27, 2009, Morgenthau announced that he would not seek re-election in 2009, saying: "I never expected to be here this long ... [R]ecently, I figured that I'd served 25 years beyond the normal retirement age." He was succeeded in office by Cyrus Vance Jr., a prosecutor under Morgenthau and the son of former President Jimmy Carter's secretary of state Cyrus Vance. Morgenthau officially endorsed Vance on June 25. Vance went on to win the primary election on September 15, 2009 and the subsequent general election on November 3. On January 20, 2010, Morgenthau joined the law firm Wachtell, Lipton, Rosen & Katz.

=== Selected cases ===
Cases which Morgenthau's office prosecuted include:

- Mark David Chapman (1981): Chapman pleaded guilty to second-degree murder in the killing of John Lennon and was sentenced to 20-years-to-life in prison. He has been denied parole multiple times and will likely never get out of jail.
- Robert Chambers, the "Preppie Killer" (1988): Chambers pleaded guilty to manslaughter in the killing of 18-year-old Jennifer Levin while the jury had the case and served 15 years in prison.
- Central Park Jogger case (1989): Five teenaged suspects were wrongly convicted of assaulting and raping 28-year-old Trisha Meili in a "wilding" incident in the north section of Central Park. After Morgenthau's office investigated the confession in 2002 by another man, including finding that his DNA matched evidence at the scene, he recommended vacating the convictions of the five men and dismissal of charges, which the court accomplished.
- Dennis Kozlowski and Mark Swartz (2005): The top two executives of Tyco were found guilty of stealing more than $150 million from the company they had been entrusted to manage.
- Tupac Shakur (1994), he was convicted in New York City of three charges of sexual molestation, and served nine months in prison.
- BCCI (1991), The Bank of Credit and Commerce International, its founder Agha Hasan Abedi and former CEO Swaleh Naqvi were indicted on twelve counts of fraud, money laundering and larceny.

=== Selected assistant district attorneys under Morgenthau ===
- Sonia Sotomayor (1979–1984): Current Associate Justice of the Supreme Court of the United States
- Eliot Spitzer (1986–1992): Former Governor and Attorney General of New York State
- Andrew Cuomo (1984–1985): Former Governor of New York, previously served as New York State Attorney General, and as Secretary of Housing and Urban Development under President Bill Clinton
- Lanny A. Breuer (1985–1989): Former head of the Criminal Division of the Department of Justice
- John F. Kennedy Jr. (1989–1993): Son of President John F. Kennedy and Jacqueline Kennedy, journalist, lawyer, and socialite
- Robert F. Kennedy Jr. (1982–1983): Third child of Senator Robert F. Kennedy and Ethel Kennedy
- Linda Fairstein (1976–2002): Former head of the Sex Crimes Unit, and current author of crime novels
- Cyrus Vance Jr. (1982–1988): Former New York County District Attorney, son of Cyrus Vance, who was the Deputy Secretary of Defense under President Lyndon B. Johnson and Secretary of State under President Jimmy Carter
- Jennifer Choe-Groves (1994–1997): Current Article III Judge, U.S. Court of International Trade

== Television characters ==
The character of District Attorney Adam Schiff (played by actor Steven Hill), the New York district attorney in the long-running TV series Law & Order from 1990 through 2000, was loosely based on Morgenthau. Morgenthau reportedly was a fan of the character.

From 2021 through 2023, a fortysomething Robert Morgenthau was portrayed by actor Justin Bartha in seven episodes of the Epix series that takes place in the mid-1960s, Godfather of Harlem.

== Affiliations ==
Morgenthau's other principal civic activities were the Police Athletic League of New York City, which he served since 1962, first as president and then chairman, and the Museum of Jewish Heritage, of which he was chairman.

== Awards ==
In 2005, Morgenthau received The Hundred Year Association of New York's Gold Medal "in recognition of outstanding contributions to the City of New York". Morgenthau also received the Association Medal of the New York City Bar Association for exceptional contributions to the honor and standing of the bar in the city of New York.

In 2016 he received the Leo Baeck Medal.

== Personal life ==
His first wife was Martha Pattridge, a Christian, whom he met in college; they had five children: Joan Morgenthau Wadsworth, Anne Pattridge Morgenthau Grand, Robert Pattridge Morgenthau, Elinor Gates Morgenthau, and Barbara Elizabeth Morgenthau Lee. Elinor, known as "Nellie," suffered from a severe mental disability. She "did not speak ... was violent" and never really recognized her own parents. When Nellie was five years old, Morgenthau very reluctantly agreed to place her in an upstate New York treatment facility. As of 2023, at age 72, Nellie Morgenthau remains in a similar private facility, never having recognized her visiting father.

The Morgenthaus raised their children in the Jewish faith. Martha died in 1972. Morgenthau was devastated by her death, and for a while afterward, he refused to talk about her in order to avoid memories of her death.

In 1977, he married Lucinda Franks, an author who in 1971 won a Pulitzer Prize for National Reporting. She was also Christian. They had two children: Joshua Franks Morgenthau (born 1984), and Amy Elinor Morgenthau (born 1990). They lived in New York City. They remained married until his death and Franks survived him until she died on May 5, 2021. His son Joshua runs the family farm, Fishkill Farms, founded by Henry Morgenthau Jr.

=== Death ===
Morgenthau died at Lenox Hill Hospital in Manhattan on July 21, 2019, after a short illness. He was ten days shy of his 100th birthday, and is buried in Mount Pleasant Cemetery, New York.

Legal offices
| Preceded by Morton S. Robson; Acting | United States Attorney for the Southern District of New York; 1961–1962 | Succeeded by Vincent L. Broderick; Acting |
| Preceded by Vincent L. Broderick; Acting | United States Attorney for the Southern District of New York; 1962–1970 | Succeeded by Whitney North Seymour Jr. |
| Preceded by Richard Kuh | New York County District Attorney; 1975–2009 | Succeeded by Cyrus Vance Jr. |
Party political offices
| Preceded by W. Averell Harriman | Democratic nominee for Governor of New York; 1962 | Succeeded by Frank D. O'Connor |
| Preceded by W. Averell Harriman | Liberal nominee for Governor of New York; 1962 | Succeeded by Franklin Delano Roosevelt Jr. |
