= Mayer Lehman =

German-American businessman

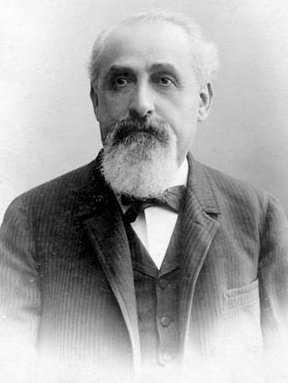
- Lehman c. 1890
- Born: January 9, 1830; Rimpar, Kingdom of Bavaria
- Died: June 21, 1897 (aged 67); New York City, U.S.
- Occupation: Merchant
- Spouse: Babetta Newgass
- Children: 7, including Irving Lehman and Herbert H. Lehman
- Relatives: Lehman family
- Family: Henry Lehman (brother); Emanuel Lehman (brother)

Mayer Lehman (/ˈliːmən/ LEE-mən) (January 9, 1830 – June 21, 1897) was an American businessman, banker and philanthropist. He was one of the three founding brothers of the investment bank Lehman Brothers.

== Early life ==
Mayer Lehman was born in 1830 to a German Jewish family in the small Franconian town of Rimpar near Würzburg. He was the son of Eva (Rosenheim) and a cattle merchant, Abraham Löw Lehmann.

== Career and life in the United States ==
In 1850, Mayer emigrated to the United States, joining his brothers, Henry Lehman and Emanuel Lehman, in Montgomery, Alabama. His brother Henry had left Germany in 1844 and opened a dry goods store named "H. Lehman". His brother Emanuel left Germany in 1847 and joined Henry in his business endeavor, which they renamed "H. Lehman and Bro." With the arrival of Mayer in 1850, it became Lehman Brothers.

As cotton was the most important crop of the Southern United States and global demand led to profitable business, the Lehman brothers became cotton factors, accepting cotton bales from customers as payment for their merchandise. Cotton trading eventually became the main thrust of their business.

Mayer Lehman supported the Southern cause during the American Civil War. Mayer was listed as the owner of seven slaves ("three males and four females ranging in age from 5 to 50") in the U.S. Census of 1860. In 1864, the Governor of Alabama, Thomas H. Watts, appointed Mayer as a Commissioner to visit and look after the interests of Alabama Confederate soldiers being held as prisoners of war in the North. Other offers of public position were made to him but he declined.

In 1855, his brother Henry died from yellow fever while travelling in New Orleans. In 1867, Mayer and Emanuel moved the company's headquarters to New York City, leaving their New Orleans cotton operation (renamed Lehman, Newgass & Co) in the hands of their brother-in-law Benjamin Newgass (father of British war hero Harold Newgass). They eventually built their New York operation into an important American investment bank, which was in operation until its September 2008 collapse.

Mayer Lehman was one of the organizers of the New York Cotton Exchange, the oldest commodities exchange in New York City, and served as its director. Mayer Lehman concentrated on the railroad, land, industrial and mining enterprises of the business. He served as the director of The Hamilton Bank, The American Cotton Oil Company, The Union Oil Company of Providence, Rhode Island, and The N.K. Fairbank Company of Chicago.

== Philanthropy ==
Mayer Lehman took an active interest in philanthropic work and was a trustee of Temple Emanu-El as well as a generous giver to the Mount Sinai Hospital in New York City. He was also a member of the Harmonie Club.

== Personal life ==
In 1858, Mayer Lehman married Babetta Newgass, the daughter of Isaac Newgass. Her sister, Esther, was married to banker Isaias W. Hellman. Together they had eight children; seven survived childhood:

- Sigmund M. Lehmann (1859–1930) - Was one of the founders of Montefiore Hospital.
- Hattie Lehman Goodhart; married Philip Julius Goodhart; parents of Arthur Lehman Goodhart
- Lisette "Settie" (1864–1936); married Morris Fatman (1858–1930); parents of Elinor Morgenthau, the wife of Henry Morgenthau Jr., and grandparents of Robert M. Morgenthau
- Clara Lehman Limburg
- Arthur Lehmann - Co-founder of the Federation of Jewish Philanthropies and the Museum of the City of New York and father of philanthropists Dorothy Lehman Bernhard and Helen Lehman Buttenwieser.
- Irving Lehman - Chief Judge of the New York Court of Appeals from 1940 to 1945; Longtime president of the 92nd Street Y and Temple Emanu-El.
- Herbert H. Lehman - the 45th Governor of New York (1933–1942) and US Senator from New York (1949–1956).

The couple were Reform Jews who, although they always observed the religious holidays, frowned on many other religious traditions and practices, instead focusing on educating their children in language, history and culture. The one tradition that Mayer emphasized was the Jewish tradition of tsedaka, the joy of giving. To instill the importance of charity into his children, Mayer took his three youngest — Arthur, Irving and Herbert — to Mount Sinai Hospital every Sunday to see the great needs of the less fortunate.

Mayer Lehman died at his home in New York on June 21, 1897.
