= Elinor Morgenthau =

American Democratic party activist (1892–1949)

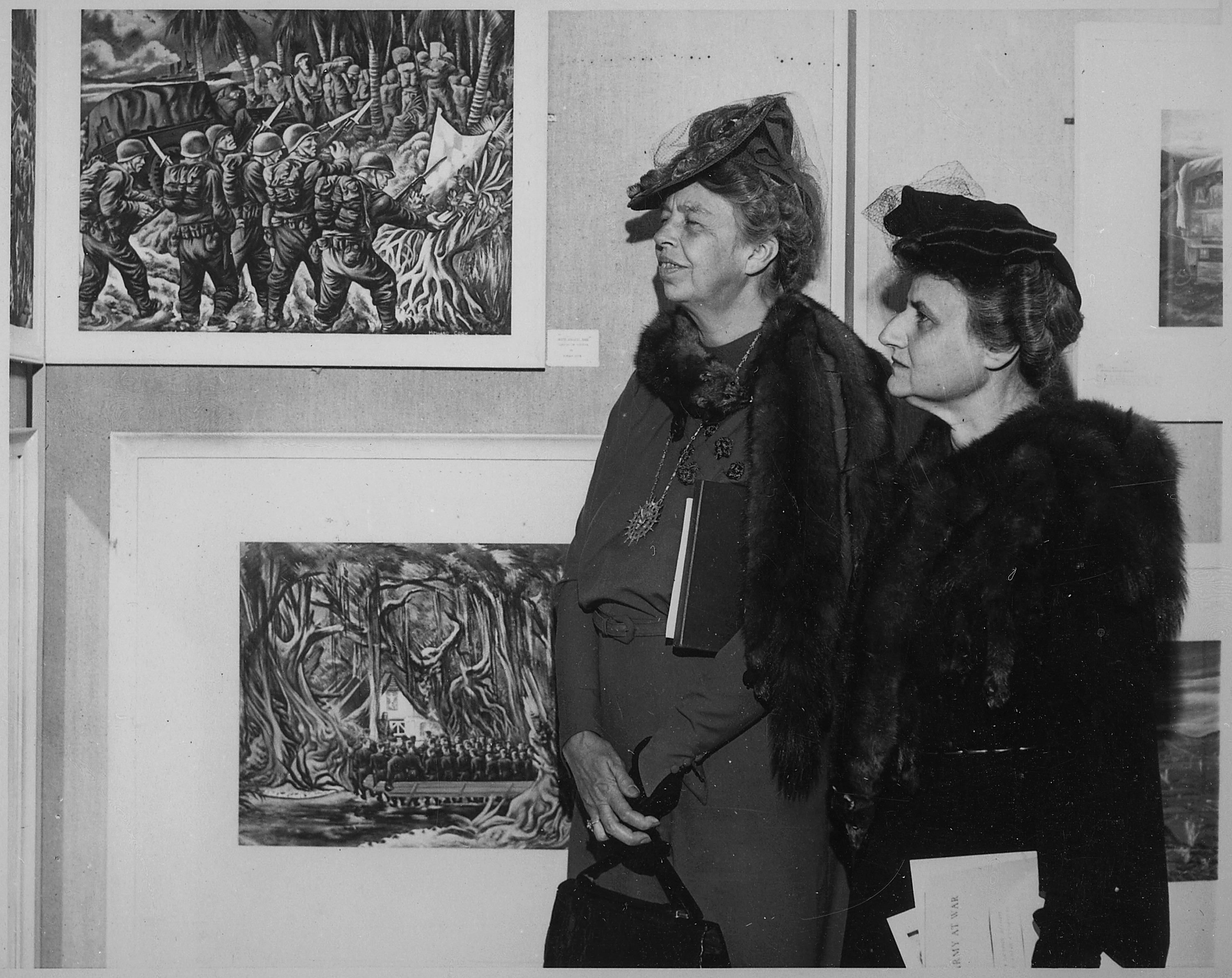
- Morgenthau with Eleanor Roosevelt in New York City (September 29, 1944)
- Born: Elinor Lehman Fatman; February 19, 1892; New York, US
- Died: September 21, 1949 (aged 57); New York, US
- Education: A.B. Vassar College
- Occupation: Political activist
- Spouse: Henry Morgenthau Jr. (m. 1916)
- Children: Henry Morgenthau III; Robert Morgenthau; Joan Morgenthau Hirschhorn
- Family: Mayer Lehman (grandfather); Henry Morgenthau Sr. (father-in-law)

Elinor Lehman Morgenthau (née Fatman; February 19, 1892 – September 21, 1949) was an American Democratic party activist, member of the Lehman family, and spouse of Henry Morgenthau Jr.

== Biography ==
Elinor Lehman Fatman was born to a Jewish family in New York City, the daughter of Lisette "Settie" (née Lehman) and Morris Fatman, a clothing manufacturer. Her grandfather was Mayer Lehman, a co-founder of Lehman Brothers. She had one older sister, Margaret. She attended the Jacobi School for girls and then graduated from Vassar College with a degree in theater in 1913. After school, she taught acting at the Henry Street Settlement where she met her future husband Henry Morgenthau Jr., the son of ambassador Henry Morgenthau Sr. They married in 1915 and settled in Dutchess County, New York where her husband became involved in local politics and operated a farm which they named Fishkill Farms. Morgenthau also became active in politics and served as the speaker for the state Democratic Committee Women’s Division.

In 1916, she and her husband became close friends with Eleanor and Franklin D. Roosevelt; like the Morgenthaus, the Roosevelts were active Democrats in predominantly Republican Dutchess County. The Morgenthaus actively campaigned for FDR thereafter and after Roosevelt was elected president, her husband was appointed as Secretary of Treasury in 1934. The Morgenthaus were the only Jewish family with whom the Roosevelts were intimate, and Eleanor Roosevelt resigned from the Colony Club of New York in protest of its refusal to admit her friend. In 1941, Elinor Morgenthau became Eleanor Roosevelt's assistant in the Office of Civilian Defense. As a close personal friend of Eleanor Roosevelt, Morgenthau was influential in convincing the president to take a more active role in supporting World War II refugees through the creation of the War Refugee Board.

== Personal life ==
Although Jewish by descent, the Morgenthaus were not religious. They celebrated both Christmas and Easter and they avoided purely Jewish social networks. The couple had three children: television producer Henry Morgenthau III; New York District attorney Robert Morgenthau, and physician Joan Morgenthau Hirschhorn. They had homes in New York City and at their farm in Dutchess County, New York. Morgenthau died of a stroke in New York on September 21, 1949.
