= Philip Lilienthal =

Philip Lilienthal may refer to:

- Philip H. Lilienthal (born 1940), American lawyer, camp director, and philanthropist
- Philip N. Lilienthal (1850–1908), American banker and philanthropist
