= Lake Anne Village Center Historic District =

Historic district in Virginia, United States

- U.S. National Register of Historic Places
- U.S. Historic district
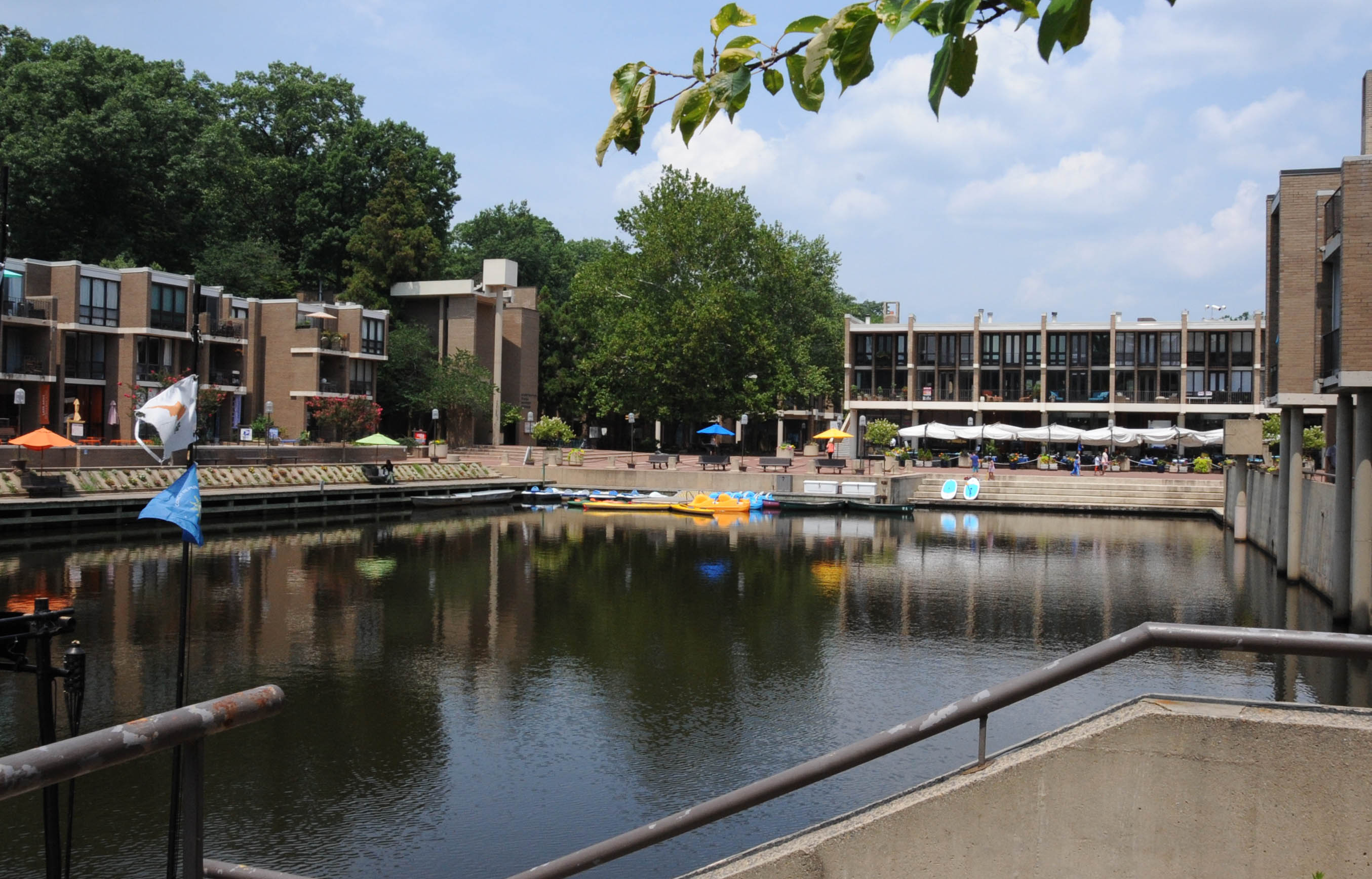
- Residences and the Baptist church

- Location within Virginia Location within the United States
- Location: North Shore Dr. and Washington Plaza W. and N., Reston, Virginia
- Coordinates: 38°58′8″N 77°20′27″W
- Area: 41 acres (17 ha)
- NRHP reference No.: 100001041
- Added to NRHP: June 5, 2017

The Lake Anne Village Center Historic District encompasses the central plaza and surrounding buildings of Lake Anne Center in Reston, Virginia.

== Description ==
Lake Anne Center was the first village center created in the planned community of Reston, and features a mix of commercial and residential buildings around a plaza and inlet of Lake Anne, a man-made reservoir. The village center was designed by Reston's master planner and architect James Rossant of New York City for Robert E. Simon and built 1963–67. At the time it was considered a showcase of modern community planning; architecturally, it is composed mainly of modestly scaled Brutalist structures, including residential townhouses, mixed commercial-residential buildings, and a church.

The district was listed on the National Register of Historic Places in 2017.

== History ==
Originally the land was attempted to be developed into a town by Dr. C. A. Wiehle in the 1890s, but it never grew to more than a handful of buildings. Before development into Lake Anne, the land was owned by the Bowman family for their 7,000 acre farm. The Bowmans tried developing the land into a farm, but eventually decided to sell it instead to Robert E. Simon.

== Events ==
The Lake Anne Village Center has been the location for a number of events in the Reston area.

One of the popular events is the Lake Anne Cardboard Regatta, hosted by the Reston Museum. During this event, teams create life sized cardboard boats and compete in various races.

Another popular event is the Reston Multicultural Festival, which has been hosted at Lake Anne in the past. This event includes live musical performances from a variety of different cultural backgrounds.

On Saturdays there is a farmer's market located in the parking lot of the Village Center. This event runs from April until December each year, where residents can buy fresh produce, flowers, along with fresh food.

Additionally, there is a craft market in the Village Center hosted by the United Christian Parish.

== See also ==
- National Register of Historic Places listings in Fairfax County, Virginia
