= Lake Anne =

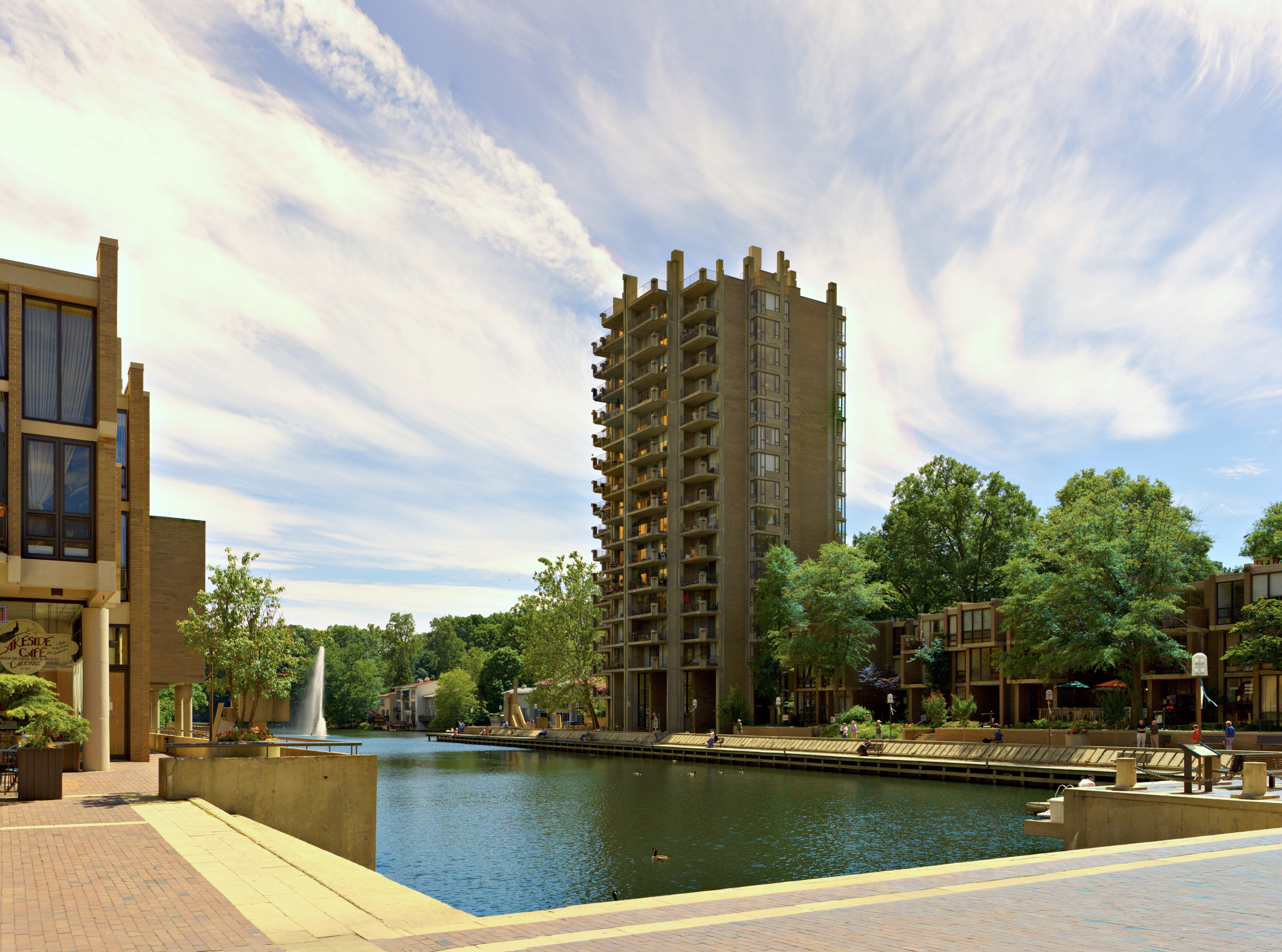
- Lake Anne, looking from Washington Plaza onto Heron House

- Location within Virginia Location within the United States
- Location: Reston, Virginia
- Coordinates: 38.9653°N 77.3375°W
- Type: Reservoir
- Basin countries: United States

Lake Anne is a reservoir in the unincorporated suburban community of Reston in Fairfax County, Virginia, United States. The lake is part of the Difficult Run drainage area of the county.

== Description ==
Lake Anne is one of Reston's four man-made lakes. Prior to its development, the land was home to open fields and forests. It was built in 1962 and named after Anne W. Simon, the spouse of Robert E. Simon, Reston's founder. The contents of the lake come mainly from rainfall and surface runoff, as well as underground springs.

Lake Anne is also the name of the historic village center that surrounds the lake. Lake Anne and its adjacent neighborhood form the nucleus of the original Reston development. James Rossant and William Conklin designed Lake Anne Village in the Brutalist architectural style. It was officially dedicated on December 4, 1965.

Reston founder Robert E. Simon spent the last third of his life in Heron House (designed by Rossant and named after the great blue heron found in the area) on Lake Anne.

The village center was named to the National Register of Historic Places in 2017.

== See also ==
- James Rossant
- Robert E. Simon
