= Barbara W. Tuchman =

American historian and author (1912–1989)

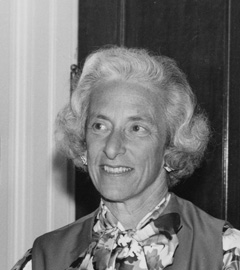
- Tuchman in 1971
- Born: Barbara Wertheim; January 30, 1912; New York City, New York, U.S.
- Died: February 6, 1989 (aged 77); Greenwich, Connecticut, U.S.
- Education: Radcliffe College (BA)
- Occupations: Writer; journalist; historian
- Spouse: Lester R. Tuchman (m. 1940)
- Children: 3 (including Jessica Mathews)
- Parent(s): Maurice Wertheim and Alma Morgethau Wertheim
- Relatives: Anne W. Simon (sister); Rafe Pomerance (nephew); Henry Morgenthau (maternal grandfather); Helen Morgenthau Fox (maternal aunt); Henry Morgenthau Jr. (maternal uncle); Robert M. Morgenthau (cousin); Henry Morgenthau III (cousin)
- Writing career
- Period: 1938–1988 (writer)
- Genre: History
- Subjects: Middle Ages, Renaissance, American Revolution, Edwardian era, World War I

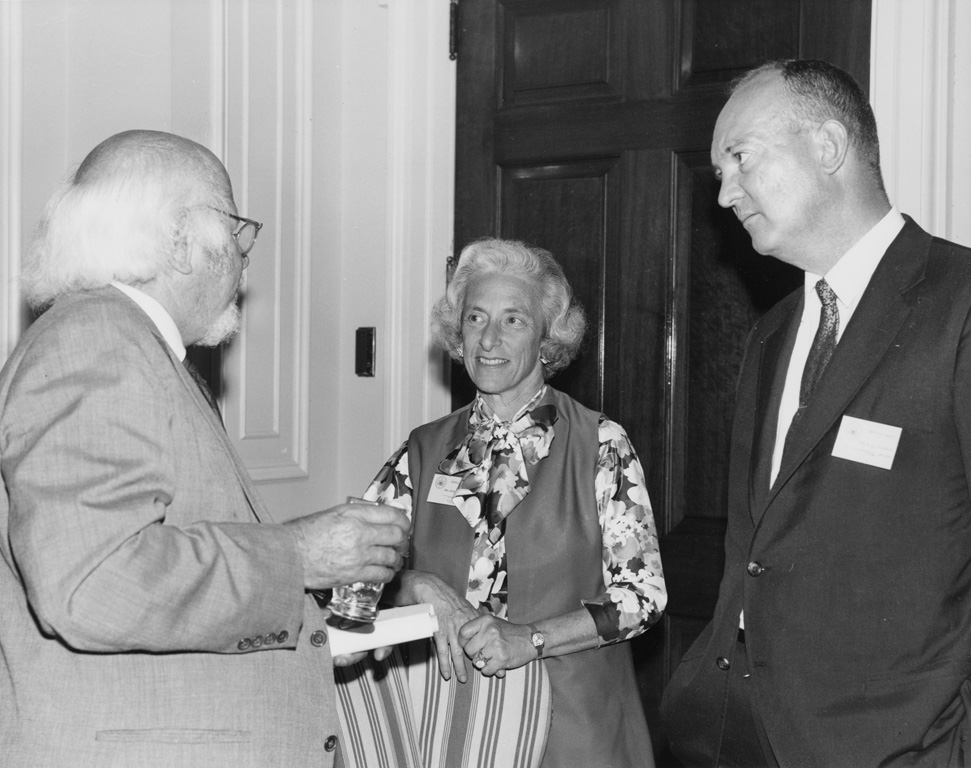
Tuchman with William L. Shirer (left) and John Eisenhower (right) in 1971

Barbara Wertheim Tuchman (/ˈtʌkmən/; January 30, 1912 – February 6, 1989) was an American historian, journalist and author. She won the Pulitzer Prize twice, for The Guns of August (1962), a best-selling history of the prelude to and the first month of World War I, and Stilwell and the American Experience in China (1971), a biography of General Joseph Stilwell.

== Early years ==
Barbara Wertheim was born January 30, 1912, the daughter of the banker Maurice Wertheim and his first wife Alma Morgenthau. Her father was an individual of wealth and prestige, the owner of The Nation magazine, president of the American Jewish Committee, prominent art collector, and a founder of the Theatre Guild. Her mother was the daughter of Henry Morgenthau, Woodrow Wilson's ambassador to the Ottoman Empire.

While she did not explicitly mention it in her 1962 book The Guns of August, Tuchman was present for one of the pivotal events of the book: the pursuit of the German battle cruiser Goeben and light cruiser Breslau. In her account of the pursuit she wrote, "That morning [August 10, 1914] there arrived in Constantinople the small Italian passenger steamer which had witnessed the Gloucester's action against Goeben and Breslau. Among its passengers were the daughter, son-in-law and three grandchildren of the American ambassador Mr. Henry Morgenthau." She was a grandchild of Henry Morgenthau; she is referring to herself. This is confirmed in her later book Practicing History, in which she tells the story of her father, Maurice Wertheim, traveling from Constantinople to Jerusalem on August 29, 1914, to deliver funds to the Jewish community there. Thus, at two, Tuchman was present during the pursuit of Goeben and Breslau, which she documented 48 years later.

Wertheim was influenced at an early age by the books of Lucy Fitch Perkins and G. A. Henty, as well as the historical novels of Alexandre Dumas. She attended the Walden School on Manhattan's Upper West Side. She received a Bachelor of Arts degree from Radcliffe College in 1933, having studied history and literature.

== Researcher and journalist ==
Following graduation, Wertheim worked as a volunteer research assistant at the Institute of Pacific Relations in New York, spending a year in Tokyo in 1934–35, including a month in China, then returning to the United States via the Trans-Siberian Railway to Moscow and on to Paris. She also contributed to The Nation as a correspondent until her father's sale of the publication in 1937, traveling to Valencia and Madrid to cover the Spanish Civil War.

In 1940, Wertheim married Lester R. Tuchman (1904–1997), an internist, medical researcher and professor of clinical medicine at Mount Sinai School of Medicine in Manhattan. They had three daughters, including Jessica Mathews, who became president of the Carnegie Endowment for International Peace.

During the years of World War II, Tuchman worked in the Office of War Information. Following the war, Tuchman spent the next decade working to raise her children while doing basic research for what would ultimately become the 1956 book Bible and Sword: England and Palestine from the Bronze Age to Balfour.

== Historian ==
With the publication of Bible and Sword in 1956, Tuchman dedicated herself to historical research and writing, turning out a new book approximately every four years. Rather than feeling hampered by the lack of an advanced degree in history, Tuchman argued that freedom from the rigors and expectations of academia was actually liberating. She said that the norms of academic writing would have "stifled any writing capacity."

Tuchman favored a literary approach to the writing of history, providing eloquent explanatory narratives rather than concentration upon discovery and publication of fresh archival sources. In the words of one biographer, Tuchman was "not a historian's historian; she was a layperson's historian who made the past interesting to millions of readers".

In 1971, Tuchman received the St. Louis Literary Award from the Saint Louis University Library Associates.

In 1978, Tuchman was elected a fellow of the American Academy of Arts and Sciences. She became the first female president of the American Academy of Arts and Letters in 1979. She won a U.S. National Book Award in History for the first paperback edition of A Distant Mirror in 1980. Also in 1980 Tuchman gave the National Endowment for the Humanities' (NEH) Jefferson Lecture, the U.S. federal government's highest honor for achievement in the humanities. Tuchman's lecture was titled "Mankind's Better Moments".

Tuchman was a trustee of Radcliffe College. Although she never received a graduate degree in history, Tuchman was the recipient of a number of honorary degrees from leading American universities, including Yale University, Harvard University, New York University, Columbia University, Boston University, and Smith College, among others.

Tuchman was a member of the Writers and Artists for Peace in the Middle East, a pro-Israel group. In 1984, she signed a letter by the group protesting German arms sales to Saudi Arabia.

== Death and homages ==
Tuchman died in 1989 in Greenwich, Connecticut, following a stroke.

A tower of Currier House, a residential division first of Radcliffe College and now of Harvard College, was named in Tuchman's honor.

== Tuchman's Law ==
In the introduction to her 1978 book A Distant Mirror, Tuchman playfully identified a historical phenomenon which she termed "Tuchman's Law", to wit:

Disaster is rarely as pervasive as it seems from recorded accounts. The fact of being on the record makes it appear continuous and ubiquitous whereas it is more likely to have been sporadic both in time and place. Besides, persistence of the normal is usually greater than the effect of the disturbance, as we know from our own times. After absorbing the news of today, one expects to face a world consisting entirely of strikes, crimes, power failures, broken water mains, stalled trains, school shutdowns, muggers, drug addicts, neo-Nazis, and rapists. The fact is that one can come home in the evening—on a lucky day—without having encountered more than one or two of these phenomena. This has led me to formulate Tuchman's Law, as follows: "The fact of being reported multiplies the apparent extent of any deplorable development by five- to tenfold" (or any figure the reader would care to supply).

Tuchman's Law has been defined as a psychological principle of "perceptual readiness" or "subjective probability" and one that is a useful guide in how to align with our subjective misunderstanding of the world's dangers fueled by television and other media where random but rare acts of violence seem more prevalent than the higher rates of harm that stem, for example, from financial fraud and corporate or government decisions.

== Bibliography ==
=== Books ===
- The Lost British Policy: Britain and Spain Since 1700. London: United Editorial, 1938. OCLC 1437885
- Bible and Sword: England and Palestine from the Bronze Age to Balfour. New York: New York University Press, 1956. OCLC 445506
- The Zimmermann Telegram: America Enters The War, 1917 – 1918. New York: Viking Press, 1958. OCLC 221110341 online
- The Guns of August. New York: Macmillan, 1962. OCLC 781625312
- The Proud Tower: A Portrait of the World before the War, 1890–1914. New York: Macmillan, 1966. ISBN 0345405013
- Stilwell and the American Experience in China, 1911–45 New York: Macmillan, 1971. OCLC 109537
- Notes from China. New York: Collier, 1972. OCLC 570634
- A Distant Mirror: The Calamitous Fourteenth Century. New York: Alfred A. Knopf, 1978. ISBN 0394400267
- Practicing History: Selected Essays. New York: Alfred A. Knopf, 1981. ISBN 0394520866
- The March of Folly: From Troy to Vietnam. New York: Knopf/Random House, 1984. ISBN 0394527771
- The First Salute: A View of the American Revolution. New York: Knopf/Random House, 1988. ISBN 0394553330

=== Other works ===
- America's Security in the 1980s. London: International Institute for Strategic Studies, 1982.
- The Book: A Lecture Sponsored by the Center for the Book in the Library of Congress and the Authors’ League of America, Presented at the Library of Congress, October 17, 1979. Washington, DC: Library of Congress, 1980.

== Legacy ==
Tuchman's historical works remain widely read and cited in both academic and popular history, maintaining her influence on historical scholarship decades after her death.

== See also ==
- Historiography of World War I
