= Philip H. Lilienthal =

- Born: September 4, 1940 (age 85)
- Education: Amherst College (BA); University of Virginia (JD)
- Spouse: Lynn Langman
- Family: Anne Wertheim Langman Simon (mother-in-law)

Philip H. Lilienthal (born September 4, 1940) is an American lawyer, camp director, and philanthropist best known for his humanitarian work in Ethiopia and South Africa.

== Early life and education ==
Lilienthal is one of two sons born to Emmy Lou (née Asch) and Howard Lilienthal, an attorney. He has one brother, Robert Lilienthal. A graduate of Amherst College in 1962, Lilienthal attended law school at the University of Virginia, receiving his J.D. in 1965. Upon graduation Lilienthal joined the Peace Corps and established Camp Langano, Ethiopia's first sleepaway summer camp. It served primarily inner city youths from Addis Ababa. In 1967, Lilienthal's Peace Corps service ended and he handed over control of Camp Langano to the YMCA, which ran it continuously until the overthrow of Ethiopian leader Haile Selassie I in 1974.

== Camp Winnebago ==
In 1974, following the unexpected death of his father Howard, Lilienthal assumed his father's position as the director of Camp Winnebago, a boys' summer camp in Maine. Lilienthal's tenure as camp director was marked by a number of achievements, including an increase in the number of international campers and counselors, the creation and expansion of a scholarship program for underprivileged youths, and the construction of a great number of new facilities, including new tennis courts, soccer and baseball fields, volleyball and basketball courts, a hockey rink, a ropes course and a historically valuable museum on the premises. He served in the position until his retirement in 2003, when he passed control of the camp to his elder son, Andrew.

=== Notable alumni ===
- Chris Berman, sportscaster, ESPN
- Alex Feder, lead singer/guitarist, The XYZ Affair
- William P. Lauder, executive chairman, Estée Lauder Companies
- Simon Rich, humorist and creator of the show Man Seeking Woman
- Adam Saunders, American filmmaker
- Eliot Spitzer, former governor, New York State
- A.G. Sulzberger, publisher, New York Times
- Matthew Yglesias, American journalist

== Global Camps Africa ==
After his retirement from Winnebago, Lilienthal established Global Camps Africa, originally, WorldCamps—an organization dedicated to helping AIDS-affected youths throughout Africa. Camp Sizanani, Lilienthal's first foray with Global Camps Africa, formed in partnership with South African NGO, HIVSA, has been a major success, creating a vital support network for some of South Africa's neediest children. Lilienthal continues to work tirelessly for AIDS-affected children throughout all of Africa. In June 2013, Lilienthal was awarded the prestigious Sargent Shriver Award for Distinguished Humanitarian Service by the Peace Corps.

== Personal life ==
In 1963, he married Lynn Langman, daughter of Anne W. Simon, granddaughter of investment banker Maurice Wertheim and Alma Morgenthau Wertheim, the daughter of Henry Morgenthau, Sr.

== Bibliography ==
- American Camping Association. ACA Directory and Manual 2003.
