= Jessica Mathews =

President of the Carnegie Endowment for International Peace

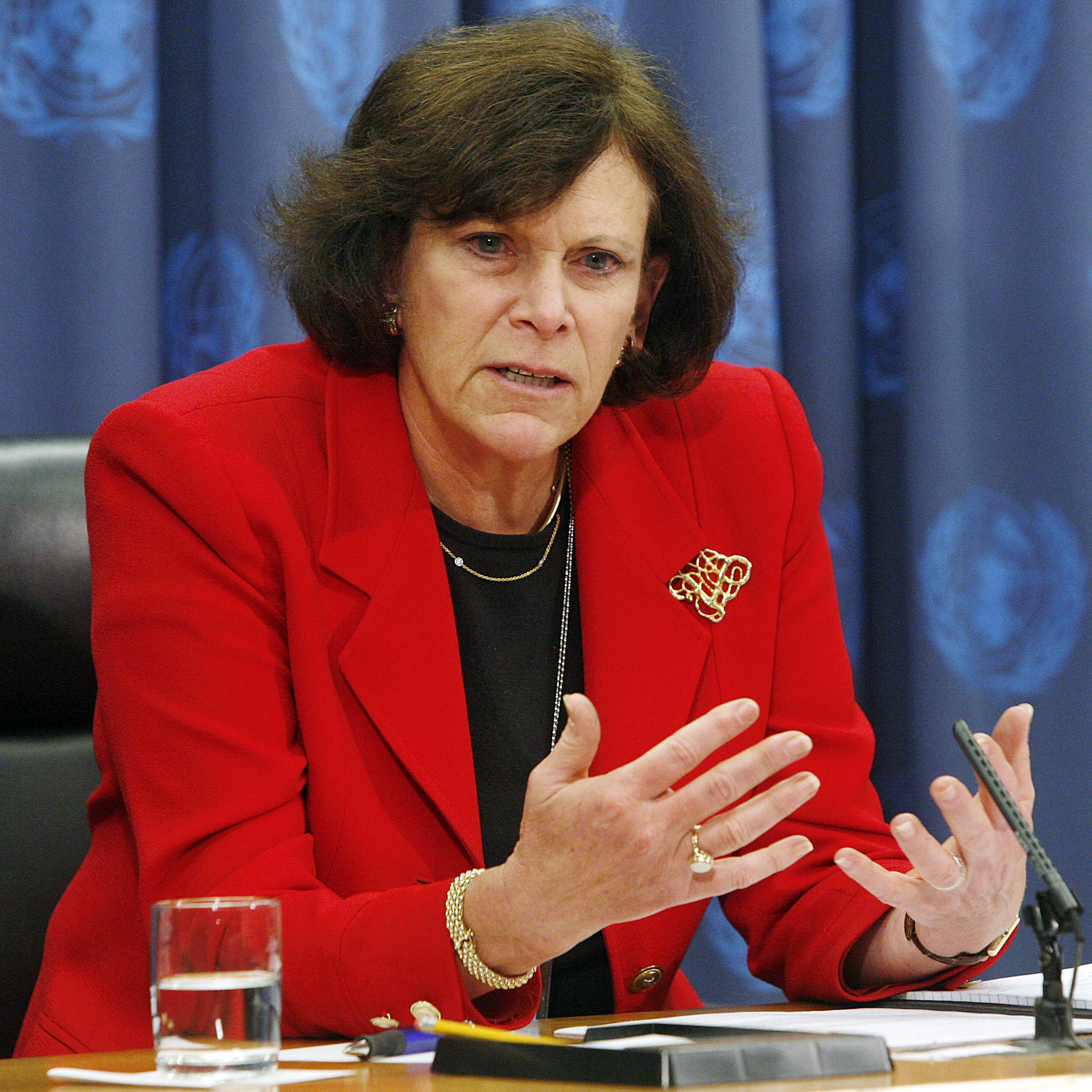
- Mathews in 2009
- Born: Jessica Tuchman; July 4, 1946 (age 80)
- Education: Radcliffe College (BA); California Institute of Technology (PhD)
- Employer(s): Carnegie Endowment for International Peace, 1997–present
- Title: Director, National Security Council Office of Global Issues
- Term: 1977–1979
- Board member of: Editorial board, Washington Post, 1980–1982
- Spouses: Colin D. Mathews (m. 1978; div. 1993); General Charles G. Boyd (m. 1994; died 2022)
- Children: 2
- Parents: Barbara Wertheim Tuchman; Lester Tuchman
- Relatives: Maurice Wertheim (grandfather); Henry Morgenthau Sr. (great-grandfather); Anne W. Simon (aunt); Rafe Pomerance (cousin)

Jessica Tuchman Mathews (née Tuchman; born July 4, 1946) is an American international affairs expert with a focus on climate and energy, defense and security, nuclear weapons, and conflict and governance. She was president of the Carnegie Endowment for International Peace, an international affairs think tank headquartered in Washington, D.C., with offices in five other countries, from 1997 to 2015. She has also held jobs in the Executive and Legislative branches of government, management and research in nonprofits, and journalism.

== Biography ==
Jessica Tuchman was born on July 4, 1946, to parents Barbara Tuchman (née Wertheim) (1912–1989), historian and Pulitzer Prize winner, and Lester Tuchman (c. 1904–1997), medical researcher and professor of clinical medicine at the Mount Sinai School of Medicine. She is ethnically Jewish. Her maternal grandfather was banker Maurice Wertheim.

Mathews attended Radcliffe College (1963–1967), earning her A.B. in 1967. She continued her education in biochemistry and biophysics at California Institute of Technology (1968–1973), receiving her doctorate in 1973.

From 1977 to 1979, Mathews was director of the Office of Global Issues of the National Security Council, covering nuclear proliferation, conventional arms sales policy, chemical and biological warfare, and human rights. In 1993, she returned to government as deputy to the Undersecretary of State for Global Affairs.

Mathews served on the editorial board of the Washington Post from 1980 to 1982, covering energy, environment, science, technology, arms control, health, and other issues. Later, she became a weekly columnist for the Washington Post, writing a column that appeared nationwide and in the International Herald Tribune.

From 1982 to 1993, Mathews was founding Vice President and Director of Research of the World Resources Institute, a center for policy research on environmental and natural-resource management issues.

From 1993 to 1997, Mathews was a Senior Fellow at the Council on Foreign Relations and served as Director of the council's Washington program. On April 9, 1996, Mathews delivered the Henry E. and Nancy Horton Bartels World Affairs Fellowship Lecture in the David L. Call Alumni Auditorium of Kennedy Hall at Cornell University. While at the Council on Foreign Relations in 1997 she published her article "Power Shift" in its journal, Foreign Affairs. Her work was chosen by the journal's editors as one of the most influential pieces of writing in the publication's 75 years.

From 1997 to 2015, she was President of the Carnegie Endowment for International Peace, a foreign policy think tank in Washington, D.C.

She is a member of the Steering Committee of the Bilderberg Group.

In 2012, she was elected to serve as one of 13 members of the President and Fellows of Harvard College, the main governing board of the university, and continues to serve in this capacity.

== Family ==
Mathews first married Colin D. Mathews in 1978. He had two children from a previous marriage. They had two sons: Oliver Max Tuchman Mathews and Jordan Henry Morgenthau Mathews. Her first marriage ended in divorce in 1993. She was married to retired Air Force General Charles G. Boyd.

== Publications ==
Articles

- "Redefining Security." Foreign Affairs, Vol. 68, No. 2, Spring 1989, pp. 162–177. doi:10.2307/20043906. JSTOR 20043906.
- "A Small Price to Pay for Proving Malthus Wrong." International Herald Tribune, June 9, 1994, p. 88.
- "Power Shift." Foreign Affairs, Vol. 76, No. 1, January/February 1997, pp. 50–66. doi:10.2307/20047909. JSTOR 20047909.
- "Estranged Partners." Foreign Policy, No. 127, November/December 2001, pp. 48–53. doi:10.2307/3183293. JSTOR 3183293.
- "Arming the Arms Inspectors." with Charles G. Boyd. The New York Times, September 19, 2002, p. A35.
- "Washington Already Knows How to Deal with North Korea."The Atlantic, April 27, 2017. Archived from the original.

Books (edited)

- Preserving the Global Environment: The Challenge of Shared Leadership. New York: W. W. Norton & Company; The American Assembly, Columbia University; Washington, D.C.: World Resources Institute, 1991.
- Global Ten: Challenges and Opportunities for the President in 2013. Washington, D.C.: Carnegie Endowment for International Peace, 2012.

Book chapters

- "The Challenge of Managing Dominance." In: Curtis, Alan (ed). Patriotism, Democracy, and Common Sense: Restoring America's Promise at Home and Abroad. Lanham, MD: Rowman & Littlefield; Washington, D.C.: Milton S. Eisenhower Foundation, 2004, pp. 83–89.

Transcripts

- "Making Inspections Work In Iraq." Arms Control Today, Vol. 32, No. 9, November 2002, pp. 12–18. JSTOR 23626867. "An Arms Control Association press conference with Daryl G. Kimball, Robert Gallucci, Jessica T. Mathews, Jonathan B. Tucker."
