= Notes from China =

- Author: Barbara Tuchman
- Language: English
- Genre: Nonfiction
- Published: 1972
- Publisher: Macmillan Publishers
- Publication place: USA
- Pages: 128
- ISBN: 9780020748007

Notes from China is a 1972 nonfiction book by Barbara Tuchman, based on her travels in China immediately following Richard Nixon's 1972 visit to China, depicting both rural and urban life in China during the Cultural Revolution under Mao Zedong. The book was one of Western audiences' first glimpses into post-Qing China.
