= Report of the International Commission on the Balkan Wars =

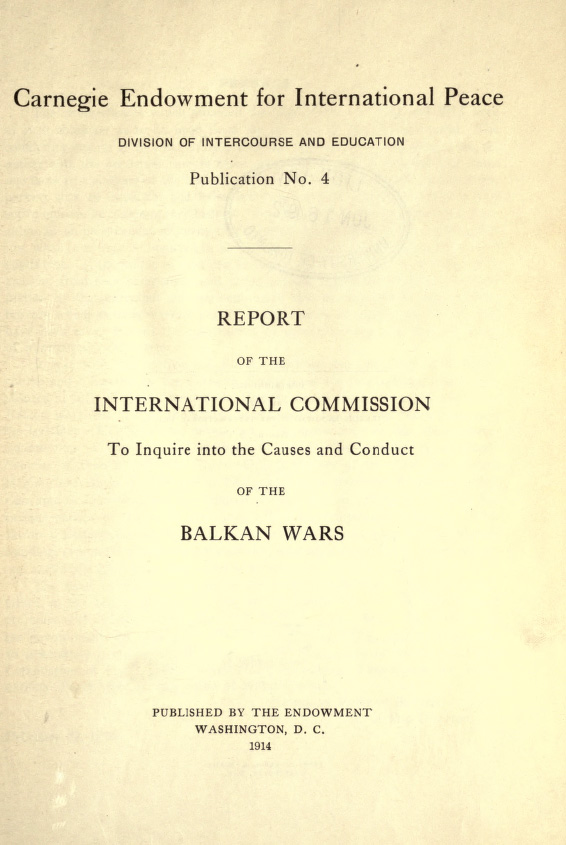
Report of the International Commission on the Balkan Wars

The Report of the International Commission to Inquire into the Causes and Conduct of the Balkan Wars is a document published in Washington D.C. in 1914 by the Carnegie Endowment for International Peace.

The International Commission consisted of university professors and other prominent individuals from France, Great Britain, United States, Germany, Austria and Russia. Among the members of the Commission there were three Nobel Prize winners.

The Commission went to the participating countries at the beginning of August 1913 and remained until the end of September. After returning to Paris all the material was processed and released in the form of a detailed report. The report speaks of the numerous violations of international conventions and war crimes committed during the Balkan Wars. The information collected was published by the Endowment in the early summer of 1914, but was soon overshadowed by the beginning of the First World War.

== Reception ==
Swiss criminologist Rudolf Archibald Reiss criticized the report in December 1914. He wrote: "I conducted my own investigations in East Macedonia for 15 days and can only confirm the Bulgarian atrocities" and added that "the Muslims and Bulgarians he encountered had made no complaints about Greek administration".

According to Mark Levene, the report is "thoroughly documented and still highly regarded". On the other hand, Albanian–Turkish academic Enika Abazi and French–Albanian historian Albert Doja write that, although the report is "often taken to offer a detailed and well-documented description of what happened in the 1912–1913 Balkan Wars", they contest this view and produce a detailed criticism of the report:

However, the Carnegie Inquiry was based on problematic fieldwork. Time for preparation had been short and the commission immediately encountered problems and was stopped and delayed several times. Thus, Serbian officials protested that one of members was anti-Serbian and pro-Bulgarian and expelled them all, while Greek officials allowed them to stay but offered them no assistance and again they formally declined to receive one of them, who was also expelled from the hotel. Another member arrived after the group had left, and instead of sending a telegram to ask where they were, he gave up and retraced his steps. Due to various issues, and to great disappointment, the commission was reduced to four members on the ground and only two of them could understand some Slavic languages. There was even a question whether the commission should persist in the inquiry at all. It was decided to continue the work, but to separate. When the members met in Sofia, their reception could not have been more useful than in Serbia and Greece, since Bulgarian officials prepared all documents and witness testimony for them. In addition, the report required considerable rewriting and editing. Many of the chapters were problematic in multiple ways, especially as it was deeply unwise for the member who had done the least field research to end up with most of the writing. Most of the members never concealed their openly pro-Bulgarian positions or anti-Serbian and anti-Greek opinions, which obviously limited the credibility of their writing and the facts they reported, or even discredited the content of some aspects of the report and allowed government officials of participating countries to use their unsubstantiated comments and one-sided opinions to protest. Finally, the report was neither adequately substantiated nor impartial, and it cannot reasonably be considered a credible and valuable source on the Balkan Wars.

From the "four members on the ground", two of them (Milyukov, Brailsford) were considered by contemporaries, and are considered by historians, to have been partisanly pro-Bulgarian and anti-Greek/anti-Serbian, while one of them (Godart) was later accused of, and is today considered by historians, to have been partisanly pro-Albanian and anti-Greek/anti-Serbian. The fourth member, Dutton, was the only member who is considered to have been sufficiently impartial and he questioned the selection of Milyiukov and Brailsfold. Although he documented atrocities from all sides, Dutton ended up being mostly critical of Bulgarian conduct.

After the report was published, organizers of the Carnegie mission, in private, were uncomfortable with what seemed to be a pro-Bulgarian bias within the final report. Meanwhile, critics in Britain attacked the report for underplaying Greek grievances and overstating the claims of their enemies.

The Carnegie Endowment reissued the report uncritically in 1993, leading some to criticise the decision for anachronism and reinforcing the stereotype of 'Balkan violence'. Maria Todorova has discussed the reissued report (and its introduction by George Kennan) as an example of 'Balkanism'.

== Members of the Commission ==
- Josef Redlich (Austria-Hungary, professor of law at the University of Vienna)
- Walther Schücking (Germany, professor of public international law, the first German judge at the Permanent Court of International Justice in The Hague)
- Francis Wrigley Hirst (United Kingdom, editor of The Economist)
- Henry Noel Brailsford (United Kingdom, journalist)
- Paul-Henri-Benjamin Balluet d'Estournelles (France, senator, winner of the 1909 Nobel Peace Prize)
- Justin Godart (France, politician, French National Assembly)
- Pavel Milyukov (Russia, historian, member of State Duma)
- Samuel Train Dutton (Columbia University, United States).
