= Samuel Train Dutton =

US-American teacher and peace activist

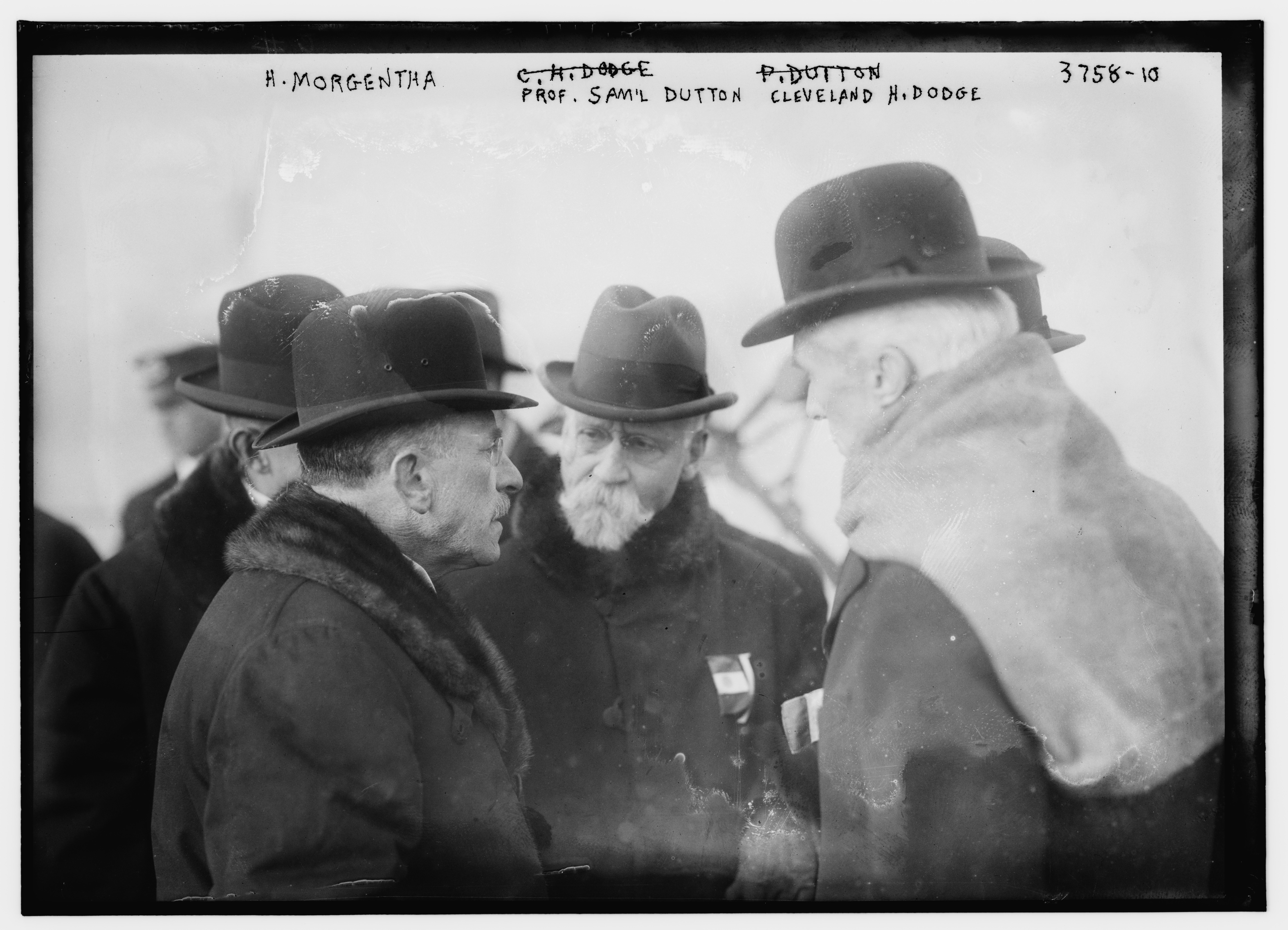
Henry Morgenthau, Sr. and Samuel Train Dutton and Cleveland Hoadley Dodge in 1916

Samuel Train Dutton (October 1849 – March 28, 1919) was the superintendent of schools at Teachers College, Columbia University. He was a founder of the New York Peace Society and the treasurer of the American College for Girls at Constantinople.

== Biography ==
He was born in October 1849 in Hillsborough, New Hampshire. He graduated from Yale University in 1873 with a B.A. and an M.A. in 1890. In 1912 he was awarded an LL.D from Baylor University.

From 1873 to 1878 he was superintendent of schools of South Norwalk, Connecticut. For the next four years he was principal of the Eaton School of New Haven before being appointed superintendent in 1882. In 1890 he moved to Brookline, Massachusetts, and was superintendent of schools for ten years, leaving for Teachers College, Columbia University in 1900.

In 1913–14 Samuel Train Dutton was a member of the international commission sent by the Carnegie Endowment for International Peace to investigate the conduct of the Balkan Wars of 1912–13. He co-authored its report.

== Personal life ==
In 1889 Dutton built a house at 219 Bishop Street in New Haven, designed by local architect David R. Brown. In 1893, in Brookline, he built a similar house at 29 Colbourne Crescent to designs by William F. Goodwin of Boston.

In 1916 he moved to Hartsdale, New York.

He died on March 28, 1919, in Atlantic City, New Jersey.
