= Anne W. Simon =

American writer and environmentalist (1914–1996)

Anne Simon
- Born: Anne Rebe Wertheim; 1914; Cos Cob, Connecticut, U.S.
- Died: July 29, 1996 (age 81–82); Manhattan, New York City, U.S.
- Education: B.A. Smith College; M.A. Columbia University
- Occupations: Environmentalist, author, writer
- Spouses: Louis Langman (divorced); Robert E. Simon (divorced); Walter Werner
- Children: 4
- Parents: Maurice Wertheim; Alma Morgenthau Wertheim
- Family: Barbara W. Tuchman (sister); Rafe Pomerance (nephew); Henry Morgenthau (maternal grandfather); Helen Morgenthau Fox (maternal aunt); Henry Morgenthau Jr. (maternal uncle); Robert M. Morgenthau (cousin); Henry Morgenthau III (cousin)

Anne W. Simon (1914 – July 29, 1996) was an American writer and environmentalist.

== Biography ==
She was born Anne Rebe Wertheim, in Cos Cob, Connecticut, the daughter of Alma (née Morgenthau) and banker Maurice Wertheim. Her grandfather was ambassador Henry Morgenthau Sr. Her sisters were Josephine Wertheim Pomerance (mother of climate activist Rafe Pomerance) and Barbara W. Tuchman (mother of Jessica Mathews). In 1935, she graduated with a B.A. from Smith College and then earned a M.A. in Social Work from Columbia University.

She began her career as a writer WNYC, a radio station in New York and later worked as a television critic for The Nation. She then wrote for various publications including McCall's and Good Housekeeping. In 1964, she wrote Stepchild in the Family: A View of Children in Remarriage based on her experiences as a stepchild and as a stepparent. In 1973, No Island Is an Island: The Ordeal of Martha's Vineyard about sprawl, traffic jams, and pollution at Martha's Vineyard. In 1978, she wrote The Thin Edge: Coast and Man in Crisis about the poor condition of dunes and beaches. In 1984, she wrote, Neptune's Revenge: The Ocean of Tomorrow, was a critique of overfishing, oil spills, radioactive waste, and toxins.

== Books ==
- Stepchild in the Family: A View of Children in Remarriage (1964)
- No Island Is an Island: The Ordeal of Martha's Vineyard (1973)
- The Thin Edge: Coast and Man in Crisis (1978)
- Neptune's Revenge: The Ocean of Tomorrow (1984)

== Personal life ==
She was born into an ethnically Jewish family. In her later life, she married thrice. Her first husband was Dr. Louis Langman whom she married in 1937; the marriage ended in divorce. Her second husband was real estate developer Robert E. Simon; the marriage ended in divorce. Her third husband was Walter Werner. She had four children from her first marriage: Thomas Langman; Betsy Langman Schulberg (married to Budd Schulberg), Lynn Langman Lilienthal (married Philip H. Lilienthal in 1963), and Deborah Langman Lesser.

She died on July 29, 1996 at her home in Manhattan.
