= Stilwell and the American Experience in China, 1911–45 =

1971 book by Barbara W. Tuchman

- First edition
- Author: Barbara Wertheim Tuchman
- Language: English
- Subject: Military history
- Published: 1972
- Publisher: Macmillan
- Publication place: United States
- Media type: Print (Hardcover)
- Pages: 768
- Awards: Pulitzer Prize for General Nonfiction (1972)

Stilwell and the American Experience in China, 1911–45 is a work of history written by Barbara W. Tuchman and published in 1971 by Macmillan Publishers. It won the 1972 Pulitzer Prize for General Nonfiction. The book was republished in 2001 by Grove Press It was also published under the title Sand Against the Wind: Stilwell and the American Experience in China, 1911–45 by Macmillan Publishers in 1970.

Following the life of Joseph Stilwell, the military attache to China from 1935 to 1939 and commander of United States forces and allied chief of staff to Chiang Kai-shek from 1942 to 1944, the book explores the history of China from the 1911 Revolution to the turmoil of World War II, when China's Nationalist government faced attack from both Japanese invaders and Communist insurgents.

== Summary ==
Prologue: The Crisis

During the Second World War, the United States Government requested that Lieutenant General Joseph W. Stilwell be placed in command of China's armed forces. Tuchman notes that an American's overseeing an ally's forces was an "unprecedented" arrangement. General Chiang Kai Shek, who was the leader of the Republic of China at the time, expressed his frustration at the request as it was not palatable to have a foreigner in command of his forces. The Chinese were said to be in a "desperate" situation in their struggles against the Japanese Forces, and President Roosevelt, in his message to Chiang, said that he knew of "no other man who has the ability, the force and the determination to offset the disaster that now threatens China." Chiang ultimately accepted the request with the remark, according to General Patrick Hurley, that Stilwell had more power in China than he had. Tuchman narrates that the American's initiative to aid the Chinese sought to prevent the Japanese from "ravaging" China and the nearby countries, hoping to maintain a foundation of stability in Asia.

Foundations of an Officer

Joseph Warren Stilwell, son of Benjamin Stilwell and descendant of Nicholas Stilwell, was a model student and athlete at the public high school of Yonkers who was set for postgraduate study at Yale. However, during the senior dance in his final year, Stilwell assaulted the refreshment table volunteer with tubs of ice cream and trays of cake, which would later be known as the "Great Ice Cream Raid". Stilwell was then punished and not allowed to graduate. This led to discipline from his father which would eventually divert Warren Stilwell to enter the West Point Military Academy and begin his military career. Stilwell would eventually meet his wife, Winifred A. Smith, during a campaign in Mexico 1908. The chapter ends with Stilwell's departure for China following the unfolding events of its Revolution in the news.

Visitor To Revolution: China

This segment of the book begins with Stilwell's arrival in China and his evaluation of China as a spiritual country. Stilwell remarks that China believes itself to be the center of civilization, warding off any evil spirits and barbarians that live beyond its border through "Feng Shui". Tuchman provides an account of China's political history, introducing the First Opium War that led to the Treaty of Nanjing, opening up China to foreign countries. Efforts of revolution then began to surface in 1911 as an attempt by several Chinese parties to restore China's independence and equality among the nations. The section ends with Stilwell leaving China with the Revolution still in its early stages.

The Great War: Saint Mihiel and Shantung

Warren Stilwell was not content with his contribution to the Army during his early years of service, consisting mainly of serving in the Department of History and Modern Languages, where he taught Spanish. Tuchman narrates that Stilwell escaped the "fate" of remaining a language instructor when his proficiency in Spanish promoted him to a temporary rank of "major" as Military Attaché in Spain, 1917. Four months later, Stilwell was appointed to France not as front line but as staff reporting to Commanding General AEF for Intelligence duty. During his post there, France aided the Allied aggression on the German defense in Saint-Mihiel under the command of John J. Pershing which eventually broke through. The fall of Saint-Mihiel and subsequent events led to the defeat of Germany which ended the First World War and led to the Treaty of Versailles in 1919. Following the treaty briefly was Japan's efforts to continue holding strategical territory over China, seizing Shantung after President Woodrow Wilson conceded over Japanese pressure and confirmed Japan as successor to all German concessions in Shantung. The bulk of the remainder of the section focuses on following the student rebellion against Japanese Occupation in Shantung and the rest of China.

Assignment to Peking: Years of the Warlords

Stilwell was appointed as first language officer for China to represent the Army in 1919 where he would practice Chinese. Tuchman then informs of the complexity of the Chinese (Mandarin and Cantonese) Language, as well as the various difficulties Stilwell encountered during his time learning Chinese. The rest of the section is devoted to Stilwell's journey through Shanxi and Shensi, visiting rural villages and the walled lotus courts in Peking China, communicating with both the lower and upper echelons of the Chinese society.

The "Can Do" Regiment and the Rise of Chiang Kai-Shek

The Kuomintang, at this time infused with new strength by its alliance with the Communist International, received aid from the Russians in the form of two advisors, Mikhail Borodin and Vasily Blyukher. Sun Yat-Sen, leader of the Kuomintang, was convinced by the two advisors that the success of the Kuomintang party was not to be accomplished by relying on opportunistic alliances without a common goal, but first by an indoctrinated force of its own. Sun, heeding their advice, sent a thirty-seven-year-old Chiang Kai-Shek, a disciple of Sun, on a military mission to Moscow, heading reciprocal indoctrination training. Soon after came Sun's death, and Chiang quickly surfaced as the Kuomintang's military chief. Chiang eventually rose to power after beginning his extermination campaign of the Communist party, seizing control of the main government. However, Chiang Kai-shek still held sovereign executive power over members of the Executive Committee in the party, and the disbandment between generals of different military divisions caused factions to move with or against each other at different times. Chiang claimed to support democracy, but Tuchman points out that Stilwell remained skeptical of the progress of "democracy" made by the Kuomintang.

"Vinegar Joe"

Fort Benning was the Army's basic tactical school. George Catlett Marshall Jr., assistant commander of the Infantry School at Fort Benning, was appalled by the casualties of World War I and believed they resulted largely from insufficient training. He needed leadership of short simple orders focused on objectives without unnecessary detail. Knowing that Stilwell fit the prescription, he swiftly appointed Stilwell head of the First or Tactical Section in Fort Benning, 1929. Stilwell's four-year tenure at Fort Benning earned high praises, with many describing him as "a genius for instruction", "farsighted", "highly intelligent", etc. His coldness and expression towards stupidity at one point earned him the nickname "Vinegar Joe". Tuchman then covers the sudden attack by the Japanese Kwantung Army on the South Manchuria Railway in 1931. Tuchman points out that Chiang Kai-Shek was unable to retaliate and was forced to make a strategic retreat. This was mainly due to military energies being spent on his extermination campaigns of the Communist Party. Tuchman suggests that Chiang held "pacification" before social, political reform, or invader resistance, and narrates that if there was one thing that could qualify Chiang for greatness, it was his "gripping conviction" to "unite" his country before everything else. However, she states that this "conviction" was just one of the several miscalculations that many historical figures like Chiang have made, as she suggests the internal warfare between multiple conflicting parties in China would be unreasonable for this "conviction" to stand. Tuchman suggests that this unreasonable "conviction" absorbed the Government's military power and would leave China unprepared for the Japanese attack.

== Themes ==
Barbara Tuchman states that the theme of the book revolves around the Sino-American relationship in the early twentieth century. Tuchman asserts that the vehicle of the theme is the career of General Stilwell during his time in China. She says that Stilwell is an important key to the theme of the book as although he was knowledgeable, experienced, and persistent, Stilwell was still not the ideal man to solve the warfare in China.

== Characters ==
General Joseph Warren Stilwell is an American General who was requested on behalf of the United States Government to aid the Chinese in their battle against the Japanese from 1911 to 1945.

General Chiang Kai Shek was the leader of the Republic of China, and commander of the National Revolutionary Army. General Stilwell aided him in his battle against the Chinese Communist Party and the Japanese in the early twentieth century.

Woodrow Wilson is the 28th President of the United States from 1913 to 1921. He was responsible for authorizing Japanese power over the German leased Shantung in China after the Treaty of Versailles in 1919.

John Joseph Pershing GCB, was a senior United States Army Officer. He held command over Joseph Warren Stilwell during the Battle of Saint-Mihiel.

George Catlett Marshall Jr. GCB served as Chief of Staff under Roosevelt and Truman, and became Secretary of Defense under Truman. He was the assistant commander of the Infantry School at Fort Benning. He would appoint Joseph Stilwell as head of the First or Tactical Section in Fort Benning in 1929.

Sun Yat-Sen was the first president of the Republic of China. He commanded over Chiang Kai Shek during his reign as president.

Mikhail Borodin was a Russian Communist International Agent, and was military advisor to Sun Yat-Sen during the 1920s.

Vasily Konstantinovich Blyukher was a Soviet Military Commander and military advisor to Sun Yat-Sen in China during the 1920s.

== Reception ==
The book received a mix of positive and negative reviews. Critics have commented on the scope the book brings to the Sino-American relations; Harold M Vinacke from Pacific Affairs remarks that Tuchman's coverage on Stilwell's experience in China is the broadest, giving the reader a very "perceptive summary" of recent Chinese History. However, the broad coverage is unable to shed light on the "Kuomintang-Communist relations" as the book was only able to "touch the fringes of Chinese Communism", as commented by Vinacke.

Thomas L. Kennedy of the Pacific Historical Review remarks that the book is a "gripping biography judiciously reinforced with analytical discussions". According to Kennedy, although Tuchman is sympathetic in her assessment of Stilwell, she is largely able to maintain an objective point of view. However, Kennedy proposes that Tuchman "sometimes fails to achieve a balanced perspective" of the various military-diplomatic problems that Stilwell faces throughout his career, although "distortions" of unbalanced perspectives are "fortunately" rarely found in the volume.

Charles F. Romanus from The Journal of Asian Studies is critical of Tuchman's text style and her account of Stilwell and the military strategies deployed in the book. Romanus deems the subheadings of the book "amateurish, demeaning" and "controversial" and they do not follow the guidelines of the army historian. Romanus advises the reader to be aware of Tuchman's sporadic subjectivity throughout this book to "see if General Stilwell is thinking and speaking for himself or if Mrs. Tuchman is forcing her own assumptions of the situation." He also comments that the "real basis of the book" is not written from "primary official source materials" and that people of oriental philosophy will disagree with Tuchman's foreign ideologies.

Kirkus Reviews said that the book leaned "toward biographical rather than political history", stating that Tuchman fails to analyze Stilwell's defeat when he does not address it in his diary. According to the review, Tuchman was not at "her descriptive best" while writing of the peak of Stilwell's military career, but the "surpassingly readable style and sensibility" established in her earlier works sustain her writing as well in this book.

The New York Times describes the book to be a valuable historical source that is "intriguing" but also "desperately sad" as it is "almost unremittingly about failure". The newspaper praises Tuchman, saying that the book is a "fantastic and complex story finely told".

== Film adaptations ==
Discussion for a possible film adaptation of the book was announced by a meeting between Jianjun Sun, President of the Pegasus Media Group, Michael Shamberg, and Alan Greisman in December 2016. The film project is assumed to be supported by the $100 million development fund formed by the Pegasus Media Group and China Film Group. Greisman will be represented by Paradigm's Bob Bookman, while Shamberg will be represented by CAA's Jonah Greenberg.

== Awards ==
The book won the Pulitzer Prize for General Nonfiction in 1972. It was also a finalist for the National Book Award for Biography in 1972.
