= Robert E. Simon =

Founder of Reston, Virginia (1914–2015)

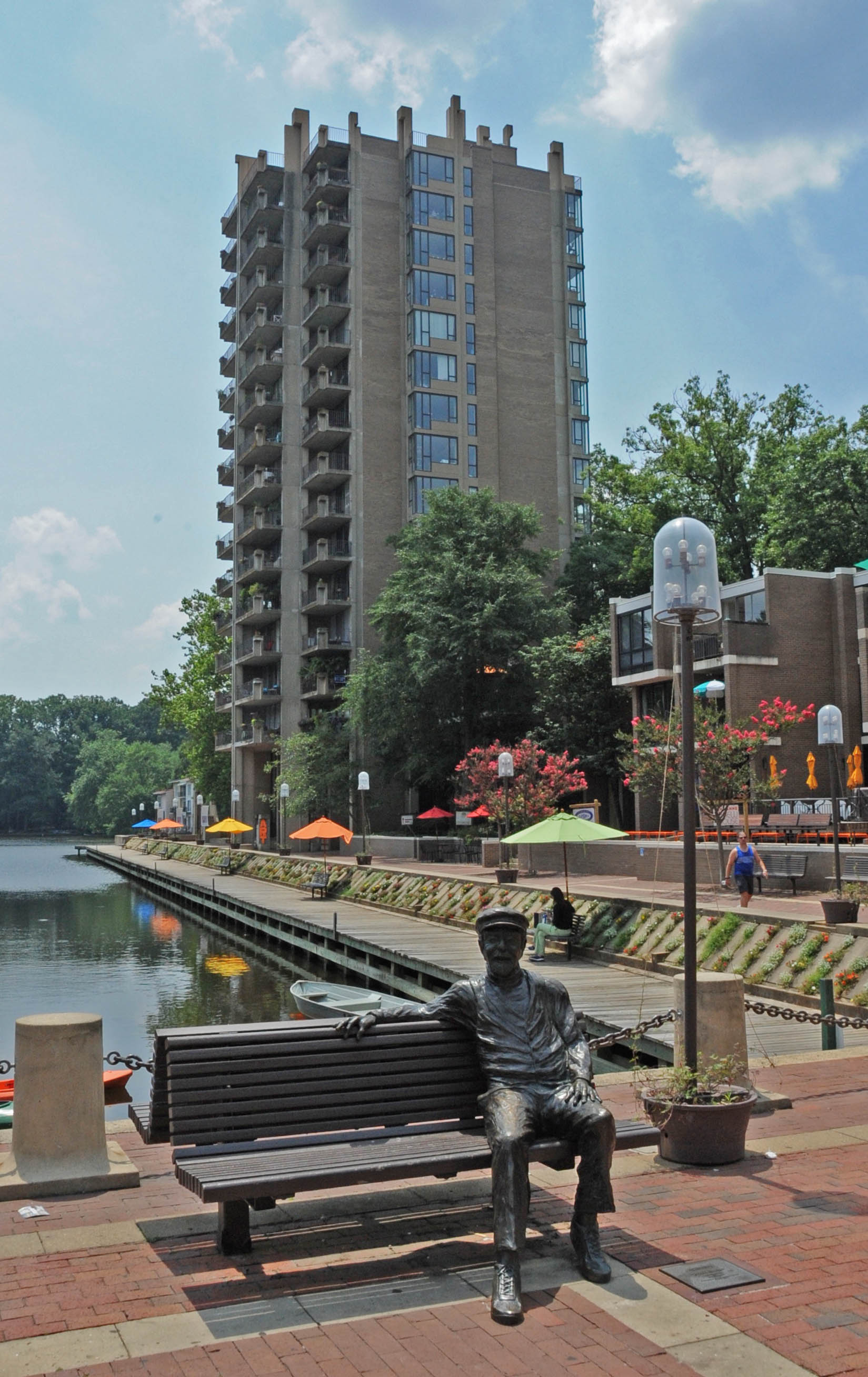
- A statue of Simon on a bench next to Lake Anne in Reston, Virginia
- Born: Robert E. Simon Jr. April 10, 1914; New York City, U.S.
- Died: September 21, 2015 (aged 101); Reston, Virginia, U.S.
- Education: Harvard University (1931–1935)
- Occupation: Real estate entrepreneur
- Years active: 1946–2015
- Known for: Founding Reston, Virginia
- Spouse(s): Anne Wertheim Langman (divorced); Cheryl Terio-Simon
- Children: 1
- Relatives: Elizabeth Fox-Genovese (niece)

Robert Edward Simon Jr. (April 10, 1914 – September 21, 2015) was an American real estate entrepreneur, most known for founding the community of Reston, Virginia. He was the maternal uncle of feminist historian and writer Elizabeth Fox-Genovese.

== Early life ==
Simon was born in New York City in 1914, the son of Robert Sr. and Elsa Weil Simon, immigrants from Germany. He was raised in Manhattan along with his four siblings. He was Jewish.

== Career ==
=== Reston ===
After graduating from Harvard University, Simon took over the family real estate management and development business. In 1961, with the proceeds from the sale of a family property, Carnegie Hall, Simon purchased 6,750 acres (27 km^{2}) of land in Fairfax County, Virginia and hired Conklin + Rossant to develop a master plan for the new town of Reston, Virginia, a planned community well known on the national level. (The town's name was derived from Simon's initials and the word "town".) Simon's new town concept emphasized quality of life for the individual and provided a community where people could live, work, and play without driving long distances.

Simon returned to live in an apartment near Lake Anne in Reston in 1993 and helped celebrate Reston's 40th birthday in 2004. In that same year a bronze statue of Simon was placed on a park bench in Washington Plaza on Lake Anne, the original heart of the community he built.

A collection of Simon's donated materials is housed at the Special Collections Research Center at the George Mason University Libraries.

== Personal life ==
Simon married four times. He was married to author and environmentalist Anne Wertheim Langman, daughter of Maurice Wertheim, and granddaughter of Henry Morgenthau Sr.

He died in Reston, Virginia in September 2015 at the age of 101. He was survived by his fourth wife (married 2004), Cheryl Terio-Simon; a daughter, Margo Prescott-Morris her 2 children (Robert's grandchildren) Christine Doolin, Noah Prescott along with great-grandchildren Sara Collier, Austin Ingram, Ashton Prescott and 8 great-great grandchildren. Also his six stepchildren, Karen Terio, Betsy Langman Schulberg (married and divorced from Budd Schulberg), Deborah Langman Lesser, Lucinda Zilk, Tom Langman, and Adam Terio.
