= The March of Folly =

1984 book by Barbara Tuchman

The March of Folly: From Troy to Vietnam
- First edition
- Author: Barbara W. Tuchman
- Language: English
- Genre: Non-fiction
- Publisher: Knopf
- Publication date: March 19, 1984
- Publication place: United States

The March of Folly: From Troy to Vietnam is a book by Barbara W. Tuchman, an American historian and author. It was published on March 19, 1984, by Knopf in New York.

== Summary ==
The book is about "one of the most compelling paradoxes of history: the pursuit by governments of policies contrary to their own interests". It details four major instances of government folly in human history: the Trojans' decision to move the Greek horse into their city, the failure of the Renaissance popes to address the factors that would lead to the Protestant Reformation in the early sixteenth century, England's policies relating to American colonies under King George III, and the United States' mishandling of the conflict in Vietnam. More than half of the book deals with US intervention in the Vietnam War, while the other three case studies are shorter.

== Critical reception ==
The book was described by Foreign Affairs as "in the Tuchman tradition: readable, entertaining, intelligent. It should lead a wide audience to think usefully about "the persistence of error.""

The New York Review of Books reacted favorably to the book, stating: "Systems and theories therefore should not be imposed on the past. The facts of the past should be allowed to speak for themselves. Why did history have to teach lessons anyway? “Why,” she asked with some exasperation, “cannot history be studied and written and read for its own sake, as the record of human behavior…?” History is not a science, it is an art. History needs writers, or artists, who can communicate the past to readers, and that has been Tuchman's calling."

Kirkus Reviews wrote in a Feb 15, 1984 review, "An exercise in historical interpretation such as this, tracing a single idea through a set of examples, is structured toward [Tuchman's] weaknesses; and they are only too apparent. Tuchman applies the concept of folly to 'historical mistakes' with certain features in common: the policy taken was contrary to self-interest; it was not that of an individual (attributable to the individual's character), but that of a group; it was not the only policy available; and it was pursued despite forebodings that it was mistaken. The only way to account for such self-destructive policies, in Tuchman's view, is to label them follies; but that, as she seems unaware, puts them beyond rational explanation."

In a May 1984 review in The New Criterion, Paul Johnson criticized the book as having followed "the conventional, not to say threadbare, lines which the liberal media developed in the 1970s: that American involvement in Vietnam was, ab initio, an error which compounded itself as it increased and was certain to fail all along. [Tuchman] thereby falls into a trap which a historian who seeks to draw lessons from the past should be particularly careful to avoid: to assume that what in the end did happen, had to happen."

In The New York Times, Christopher Lehmann-Haupt wrote, "[A]ny way one approaches The March of Folly, it is unsatisfying, to say the least. Better books have been written about Vietnam, the American Revolution, the Renaissance Popes and the Trojan Horse." He concluded, "Not only has [Tuchman] confined herself to the shallower wellsprings of history, she has committed the further sin of treating them superficially."

The book was reviewed critically by Ronald Hutton of History Today who said, "Taken as a whole, the book nevertheless leaves an impression of shallowness."
