= Maurice Wertheim =

American investment banker (1886–1950)

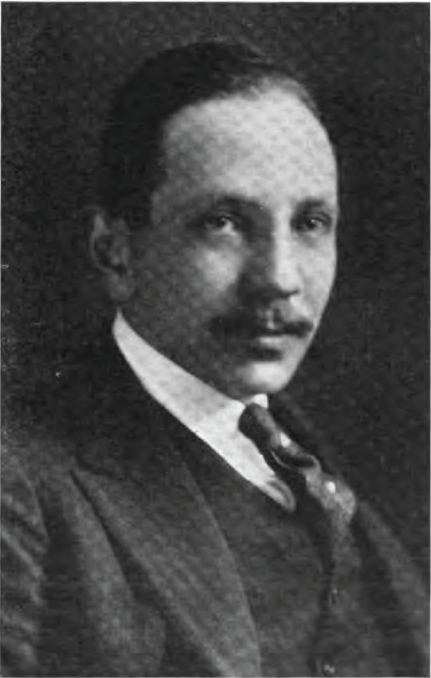
- Wertheim in 1922
- Born: February 16, 1886; New York City, U.S.
- Died: May 27, 1950 (aged 64); Cos Cob, Connecticut, U.S.
- Education: Harvard University
- Organization: Wertheim & Co.
- Spouses: Alma Morgenthau (m. 1909; div. 1929) Ruth White (m. 1930; div. 1935) Cecile Berlage (m. 1944)
- Children: Josephine (1910−1980); Barbara (1912−1989); Anne (1914−1996)
- Family: Rafe Pomerance (grandson); Jessica Mathews (granddaughter)

Maurice Wertheim (February 16, 1886 – May 27, 1950) was an American investment banker, chess player and patron, art collector, environmentalist, and philanthropist. In 1927 he founded Wertheim & Co.

== Life ==
Born to a Jewish family, the son of Jacob Wertheim of Hartford, Connecticut, and his wife, Hannah Frank of Hoboken, New Jersey, Wertheim was educated at the Sachs School in New York City. He then graduated from Harvard University in 1906 with a B.A. and received his M.A. in 1907. In his freshman year, he lived in Matthews Hall in Harvard Yard. He began work at his father's firm, the United Cigar Manufacturers Company. He would later inherit nearly half a million dollars from his father, due to his success with the company. In 1915, he entered into a career as an investment banker in New York, and four years later would become a firm partner of Hallgarten & Company. He founded his own firm Wertheim & Company in 1927, developing a very successful business in mergers and acquisitions, and becoming wealthy in the process. During World War II, he served as a dollar-a-year man on the War Production Board in the administration of President Franklin D. Roosevelt.

Wertheim served on various boards and as a trustee for various organizations. He was trustee of the Federation of Jewish Philanthropies of New York, Mount Sinai Hospital, and The Nation. He served as president of the American Jewish Committee in 1941–1943.

Wertheim was an amateur chess player and patron of the game. He served as the president of the Manhattan Chess Club, which he assisted financially and took an avid interest in playing correspondence chess. He financed the 1941 U.S. Chess Championship match between Samuel Reshevsky and I.A. Horowitz, which was won by Reshevsky.

Wertheim financed the American participation in the US vs. USSR radio chess match 1945, across ten boards, personally covering travel, site, and broadcast costs.

Wertheim conceived of the idea for the 1946 chess match between the United States and the Soviet Union in Moscow, and persuaded the U.S. State Department that it would make a difference in thawing the Cold War. He paid for all the costs, and personally led the team at the tournament.

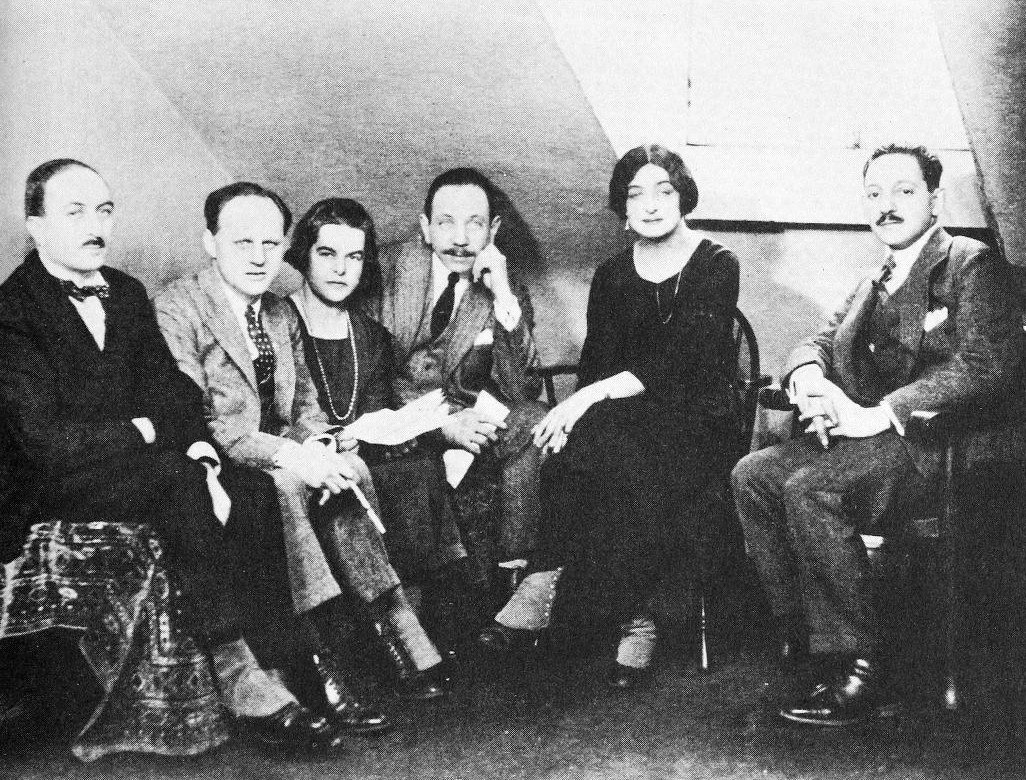
Board of directors, Theatre Guild, 1923. From left: Lawrence Langner, Philip Moeller, Theresa Helburn, Maurice Wertheim, Helen Westley, Lee Simonson

He was also actively interested in art, fishing, nature conservancy, and theater. He was an active supporter of the New York Theatre Guild, where he later served as director overseeing the Guild's operations. He acquired 1,800 acres (7.3 km^{2}) of land along the Carmans River on eastern Long Island for personal use to conserve waterfowl and for hunting. In 1947, Wertheim and his then wife, Cecile, donated the entire stretch of land to the United States government for "the American people"; the land would eventually become known as the Wertheim National Wildlife Refuge.

Wertheim amassed a notable collection of Impressionist and Post-Impressionist works that contained many famous masterpieces, including paintings and sculptures by Paul Cézanne, Edgar Degas, Édouard Manet, Henri Matisse, Pablo Picasso, and Vincent van Gogh. In his will, he arranged for the donation of his collection of French Impressionist paintings to the Fogg Art Museum at Harvard University.

After his death from a heart attack in 1950, a memorial Maurice Wertheim chess tournament was organized in 1951 in New York in his memory; it was won by Samuel Reshevsky. In 1963, Wertheim's daughter, Barbara, established the Wertheim Study Room in the New York Public Library in honor of her father.

== Personal life ==
In 1909, he married Alma Morgenthau, daughter of Henry Morgenthau Sr. They had three daughters, Josephine Wertheim Pomerance (b. 1910), mother of Rafe Pomerance; historian Barbara W. Tuchman (1912–1989), mother of Jessica Mathews; and Anne Rebe Wertheim Werner (1914–1996), previously married to Robert E. Simon.

Alma herself had her own philanthropic interests and, in 1923, was one of the founding members of the League of Composers, also subsidizing its journal, Modern Music, with 1500 annually. She supported publishing the first musical compositions of Aaron Copland, on her Cos Cob Press. She also collected work by Georgia O'Keeffe, and, together, the couple supported the Intimate Gallery. They divorced in 1929.

Following their divorce, Alma founded and supported The Cos Cob Press (eventually bought by Boosey and Hawkes) in 1929 to publish works of contemporary American composers. In 1934 she married Paul Lester Wiener (they divorced in the 1940s) and she died in 1953.

Wertheim married Ruth White in March 1930; they did not have children and divorced in 1935 (she remarried Alexander Smallens in 1935). He was married for a third time in 1944 to Cecile Berlage, who was his spouse until his death; they did not have children.

Wertheim's granddaughter, Betsy Ann Langman, was married to film producer Budd Schulberg. His granddaughter, Lynn Langman married attorney and philanthropist, Philip H. Lilienthal, in 1963.
