= Camp Sizanani =

Camp Sizanani was founded as a joint venture between Global Camps Africa, a non-profit headquartered in Reston, Virginia, and HIVSA, a South African foundation that provides care and services to HIV-affected individuals. Operating in the Magaliesburg area in North West Province, South Africa, Camp Sizanani offers multiple camp sessions throughout the year for children aged twelve through nineteen whose lives have been affected by HIV/AIDS. The term HIV-affected can imply that an individual is infected with the virus, but it can also mean that the infection of family members or guardians have impacted the individual's life. While some children at Camp Sizanani are HIV+, many more have been orphaned by a parent's AIDS-related death or have family members coping with the disease. Nearly all of Sizanani's campers come from Soweto, Johannesburg's enormous township, to which many black Africans were relegated during South Africa's apartheid era. The children attend the camp free of charge; they are sponsored by Global Camps Africa and its donors.

== Goals ==
Sizanani takes its name from a Zulu word which translates idiomatically to mean "help each other". It is largely modeled on the North American summer camp tradition. Accordingly, its stated goals include fostering independence, self-esteem, cooperative skills, respect for others and awareness of HIV/AIDS and other health issues. This final goal is particularly unique to Sizanani, given the children's backgrounds and the AIDS crisis that continues to grip South Africa.

== Curriculum ==
A day at Camp Sizanani would likely include any or all of the following: theatre, dancing, singing, and drumming; swimming; arts & crafts; adventure/teamwork; sports (including cricket, soccer, volleyball, netball, and basketball), yoga; nutrition; and Life Skills. Life Skills is an activity that teaches health awareness, prevention of STDs, sexuality, identifying abusive behaviors, gender bias, empowerment, drugs, crime, alcohol, and male circumcision. It is the single most important segment of the camp.

The 8-day camp (and 4-day staff training period) is followed by the availability to campers of six Youth Clubs that meet every other Saturday at various locations around the Soweto area. There the campers get further training in life skills, enjoy more fun, and bond with the former campers and counselors. They also take on leadership roles in their communities with community service projects, soccer teams, and singing, dancing, and theatre groups. The clubs, like camp, are offered at no charge to the camper. There is no deadline beyond which they may not attend, although they are permitted only a single camp experience, due to the large numbers of children and youth that are waiting to be served.

As of August 2016, some 8,000 campers had gone through the program.
