= Henry Morgenthau Sr. =

American diplomat

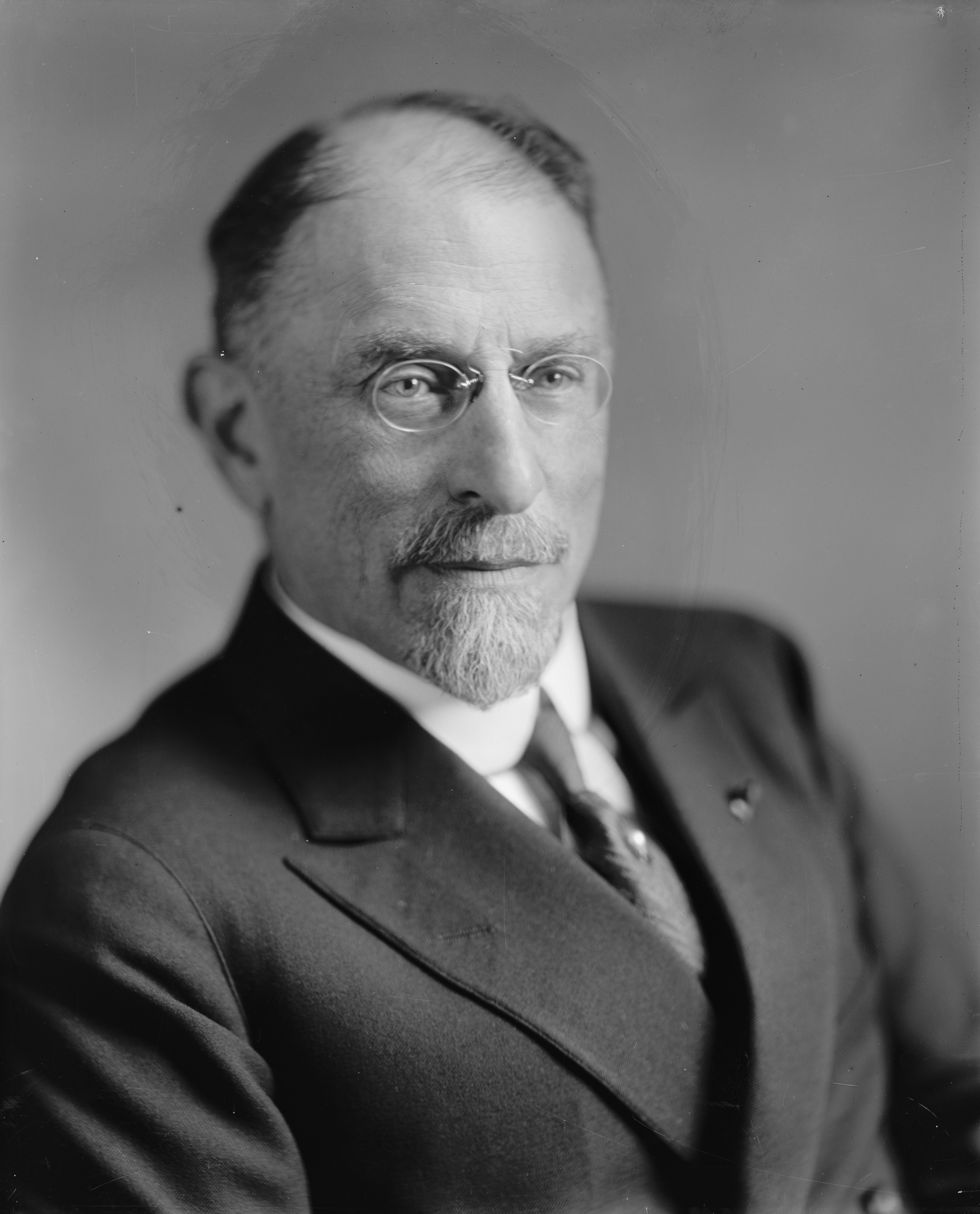
- Portrait by Harris & Ewing c. 1920s

4th United States Ambassador to the Ottoman Empire
- In office December 11, 1913 – February 1, 1916
- President: Woodrow Wilson
- Preceded by: William W. Rockhill
- Succeeded by: Abram I. Elkus

Personal details
- Born: April 26, 1856 Mannheim, Baden (present-day Baden-Württemberg, Germany)
- Died: November 25, 1946 (aged 90) New York City, U.S.
- Party: Democratic
- Spouse: Josephine Sykes (m. 1882)
- Children: Helen Morgenthau Fox; Henry Morgenthau Jr.; Alma Morgenthau Wertheim; Ruth Morgenthau
- Relatives: Henry Morgenthau III (grandson); Robert M. Morgenthau (grandson); Barbara W. Tuchman (granddaughter); Anne W. Simon (granddaughter); Rafe Pomerance (great-grandson); Jessica Mathews (great-granddaughter)
- Education: City College of New York (BA); Columbia Law School (LLB)
- Profession: Lawyer, diplomat

Henry Morgenthau (/ˈmɔːrɡəntaʊ/; April 26, 1856 – November 25, 1946) was a German-born American lawyer and businessman, best known for his role as the ambassador to the Ottoman Empire during World War I. Morgenthau was one of the most prominent Americans who spoke about the Greek genocide and the Armenian genocide of which he stated, "I am firmly convinced that this is the greatest crime of the ages."

Morgenthau was the father of the politician Henry Morgenthau Jr. His grandchildren include Robert M. Morgenthau, District Attorney of Manhattan for 35 years, and Barbara W. Tuchman, a historian who earned the Pulitzer Prize for her book The Guns of August.

== Early life and education ==
Morgenthau was born the ninth of 11 living children, in Mannheim, Baden (present-day Baden-Württemberg, Germany), in 1856 into an Ashkenazi Jewish family. He was the son of Lazarus and Babette (Guggenheim) Morgenthau. His father was a successful cigar manufacturer who had cigar factories at Mannheim, Lorsch, and Heppenheim, employing as many as 1,000 people (Mannheim had a population of 21,000 during this period). His business suffered a severe financial setback during the American Civil War, due to an 1862 tobacco tariff on imports, which closed German tobacco exports to the US for good.

The Morgenthau family immigrated to New York in 1866. There, despite considerable savings, his father was not able to re-establish himself in business. His development and marketing of various inventions, as well as his investments in other enterprises, failed. Lazarus Morgenthau staved off failure and stabilized his income by becoming a fundraiser for Jewish houses of worship. Henry attended City College of New York, where he received his BA, and later Columbia Law School.

Morgenthau initially built a successful career as a lawyer. During his life he served as a leader of the Reform Jewish community in New York.

== Business career ==
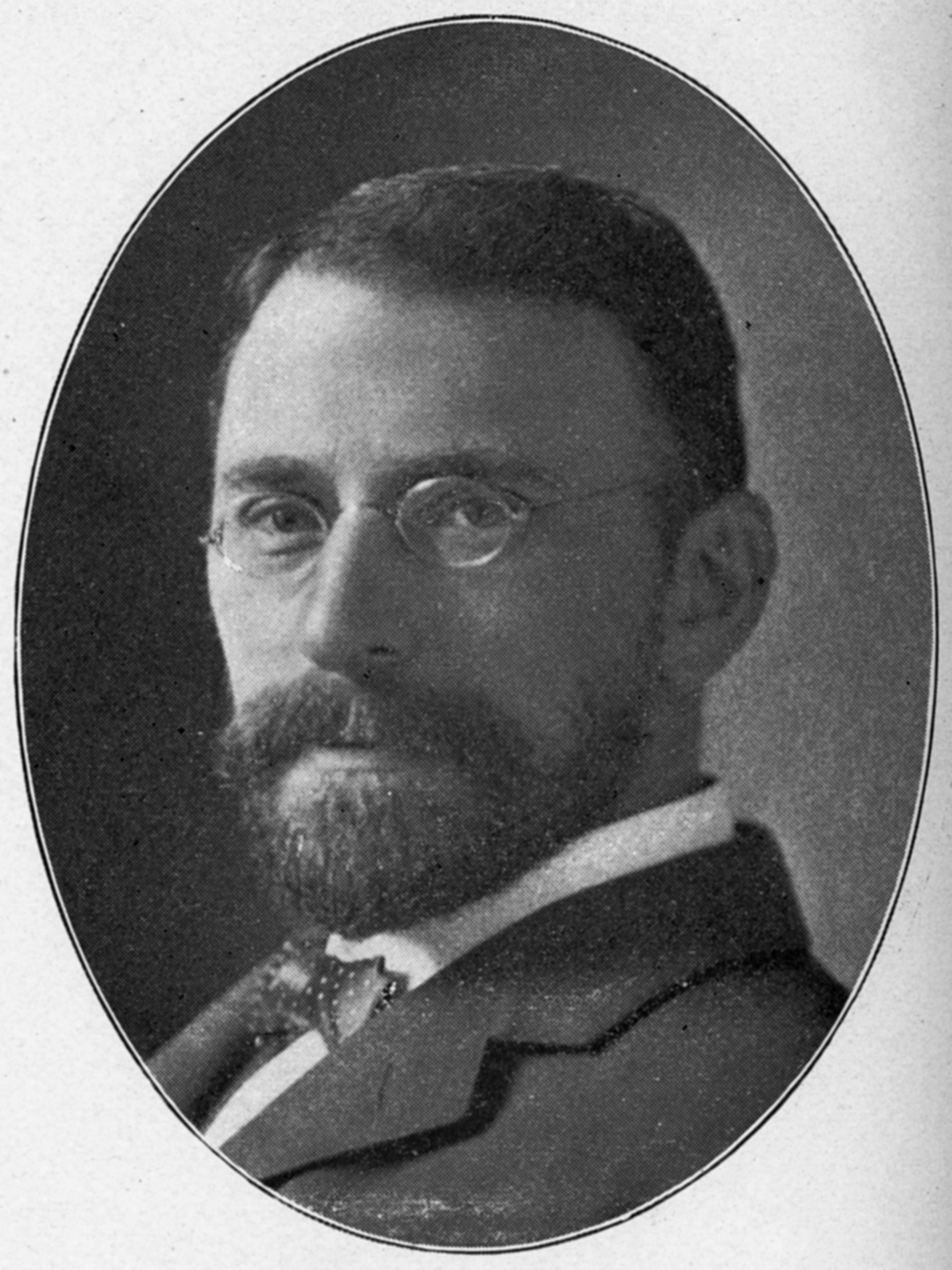
Morgenthau c. 1899

He began his career as a lawyer, but he made a substantial fortune in real estate investments. In 1898, he acquired 41 lots on New York's Lower East Side from William Waldorf Astor for $850,000. A few years later, he led a syndicate that bought a swath of undeveloped land in Washington Heights around 181st Street, anticipating the construction of the first subway through the area. In 1899 he left his law practice and became president of the Central Realty, Bond & Trust Company. He was president of the Henry Morgenthau Company from 1905 to 1913.

Morgenthau married Josephine Sykes in 1882 and they had four children: Helen, Alma, Henry Jr. and Ruth. His daughter Helen - a noted garden writer who broadcast on radio & television and lectured on horticulture - married Mortimer J. Fox an architect, banker and landscape artist. His daughter Alma - an art collector and patron of the arts & music - married investment banker, art collector and philanthropist Maurice Wertheim. His daughter Ruth married banker and philanthropist George Washington Naumburg She was also a civic leader supporting the arts and music. Ruth founded Fountain House, a home in NYC to assist those with schizophrenia and men leaving jail. It was a residence that pioneered providing psychological counseling to people, and developed the novel concept of looking after the community's mental health. She was also a board member of the Manhattan School of Music, and there she established a fund to assist troubled students at the school, which still operates. In Pound Ridge, NY she co-founded the town's library and gave it an additional reading room, and then at her death, she donated the Henry Morgenthau Preserve, Pound Ridge, NY, in her father's memory.

A nephew of Henry's, Robert E. Simon, worked directly with Morgenthau, prior to and in his real estate business [Henry Morgenthau & Co] for fourteen years (1905–1919). But his work in real estate, with Henry & others, continued until his early death. Highlights include when Henry & Robert advised and assisted Adolph Ochs, a dear family friend of Henry's, in the purchase of Longacre Square in 1902. The site became Times Square with a new building there for the newspaper (1903–05). A second highlight is Robert Simon's purchase of Carnegie Hall from Louise Whitfield Carnegie in 1925. Ownership was retained until Lincoln Center's Philharmonic /Avery Fisher/ now David Geffen Hall construction was agreed upon and soon opened. Coupled with those changes, were the NY Philharmonic's transferred location to the new hall (1962).

So, Robert E. Simon Jr. then sold Carnegie Hall in 1960. He substantially reduced the price of the Carnegie Hall sale, [by $500,000] to help Issac Stern's committee and NYC purchase and save the building. Simon then used the funds yielded to buy and construct Reston, VA - [name came from / Robert E. Simon's town] Reston pioneered the inventive use of shared open space, and it explored a breaking of the mold and formulaic approach for suburban development, up to that time.

== Political career ==
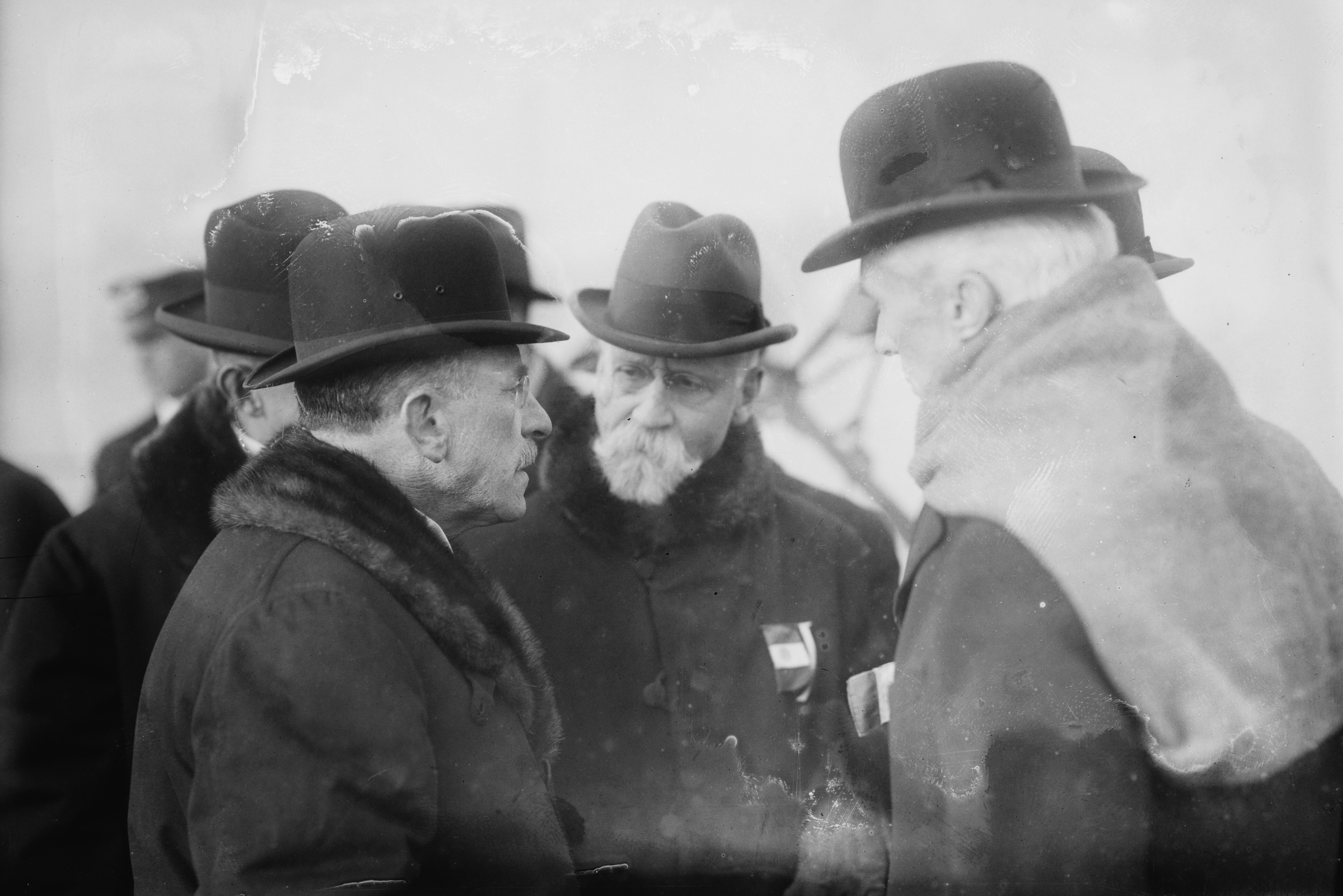
Morgenthau (left), Samuel Train Dutton (center) and Cleveland Hoadley Dodge c. 1915–1920

Morgenthau's career enabled him to contribute handsomely to President Woodrow Wilson's election campaign in 1912. He had first met Wilson in 1911 at a dinner celebrating the fourth anniversary of the founding of the Free Synagogue society and the two "seem to have bonded", marking the "turning point in Morgenthau's political career". His role in American politics grew more pronounced in later months. Although he did not gain the chairmanship of Wilson's campaign finance committee, Morgenthau was offered the position of ambassador to the Ottoman Empire. He had hoped for a cabinet post as well, but was not successful in gaining one.

=== Ambassador to the Ottoman Empire ===
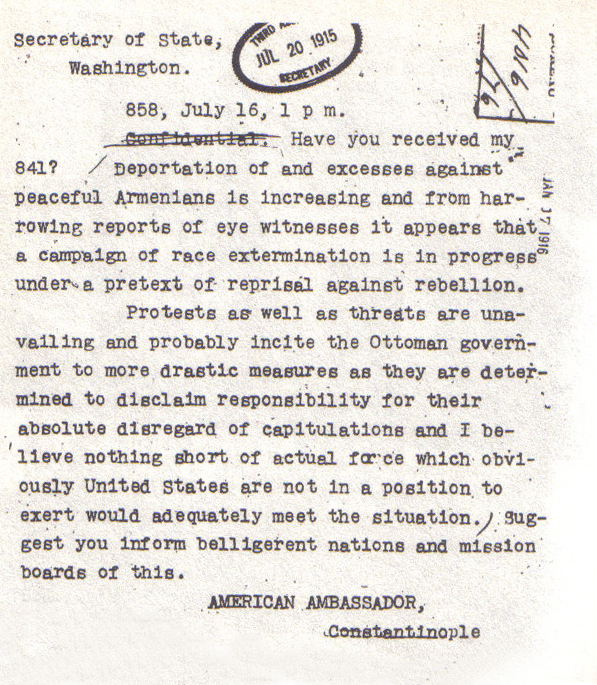
A telegram written by Morgenthau to the State Department in 1915 described the massacres of Armenians in the Ottoman Empire as a "campaign of race extermination."

As an early Wilson supporter, Morgenthau assumed that Wilson would appoint him to a cabinet-level position, but the new president had other plans for him. Like other prominent Jewish Americans (Oscar Straus and Solomon Hirsch before him), Morgenthau was appointed as ambassador to the Ottoman Empire. Wilson's assumption that Jews somehow represented a bridge between Muslim Turks and Christian Armenians rankled Morgenthau; in reply, Wilson assured him that the Porte in Constantinople "was the point at which the interest of American Jews in the welfare of the Jews of Palestine is focused, and it is almost indispensable that I have a Jew in that post". Though no Zionist himself, Morgenthau cared "fervidly" about the plight of his co-religionists. He initially rejected the position, but following a trip to Europe, and with the encouragement of his pro-Zionist friend Rabbi Stephen Wise, he reconsidered his decision and accepted Wilson's offer. Appointed as U.S. Ambassador to the Ottoman Empire in 1913, he served in this position until 1916.

Although the safety of American citizens in the Ottoman Empire, mostly Christian missionaries and Jews, loomed large early in his ambassadorship, Morgenthau said that he was most preoccupied by the Armenian Question. After the outbreak of war in 1914, the U.S. remained neutral, so the American Embassy – and by extension Morgenthau – additionally represented many of the Allies' interests in Constantinople, since they had withdrawn their diplomatic missions after the beginning of hostilities. As Ottoman authorities began the Armenian genocide in 1914–1915, the American consuls residing in different parts of the Empire flooded Morgenthau's desk with reports nearly every hour, documenting the massacres and deportation marches taking place. Faced with the accumulating evidence, he officially informed the U.S. government of the activities of the Ottoman government and asked Washington to intervene.

The American government however, not wanting to get dragged into disputes, remained a neutral power in the conflict at the time and voiced little official reaction. Morgenthau held high-level meetings with the leaders of the Ottoman Empire to help alleviate the position of the Armenians, but the Turks waived and ignored his protestations. He famously admonished the Ottoman Interior Minister Talaat Pasha, stating: "Our people will never forget these massacres." As the massacres continued unabated, Morgenthau and several other Americans decided to form a public fund-raising committee to assist the Armenians – the Committee on Armenian Atrocities (later renamed the Near East Relief) – raising over $100 million in aid, the equivalent of $1 billion today. Through his friendship with Adolph Ochs, publisher of The New York Times, Morgenthau also ensured that the massacres continued to receive prominent coverage. The New York Times published 145 articles in 1915 alone.

Audio recording of Chapter 24, "The Murder of a Nation", from Ambassador Morgenthau's Story.

Exasperated with his relationship with the Ottoman government, he resigned from the ambassadorship in 1916. Looking back on that decision in his memoir Ambassador Morgenthau's Story, he wrote he had come to see the Ottoman Empire as "a place of horror. I had reached the end of my resources. I found intolerable my further daily association with men, however gracious and accommodating…who were still reeking with the blood of nearly a million human beings." He published his conversations with Ottoman leaders and his account of the Armenian genocide in Ambassador Morgenthau's Story, which appeared in the end of 1918.

In June 1917 Felix Frankfurter accompanied Morgenthau, as a representative of the War Department, on a secret mission to persuade the Ottoman Empire to abandon the Central Powers in the war effort. The mission had as its stated purpose to "ameliorate the condition of the Jewish communities in Palestine". In 1918 Morgenthau gave public speeches in the United States warning that the Greeks and Assyrians were being subjected to the "same methods" of deportation and "wholesale massacre" as the Armenians, and that two million Armenians, Greeks, and Assyrians had already perished.

=== Interwar period ===
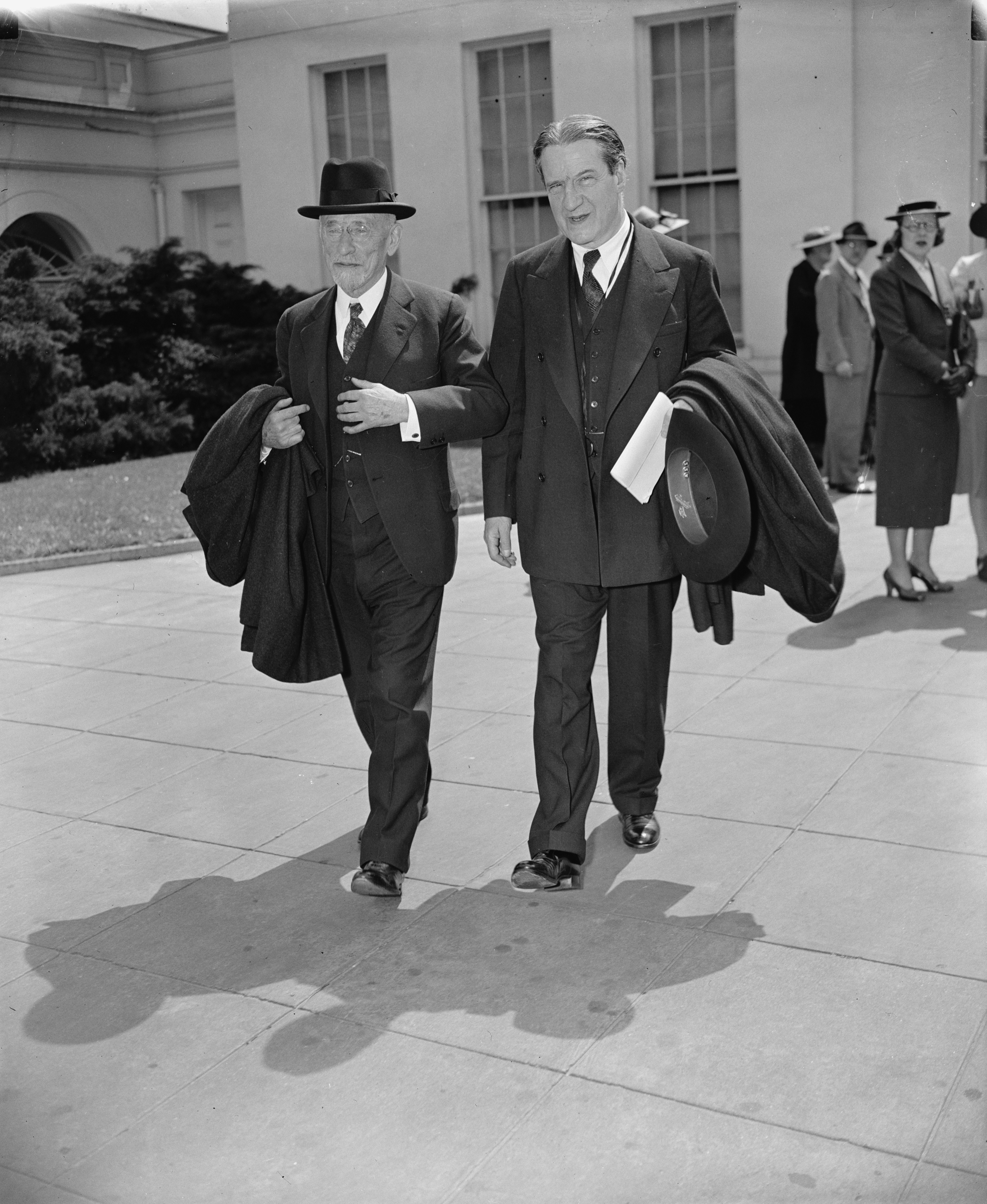
Morgenthau (left) and Rabbi Stephen Samuel Wise leave the White House after a meeting with President Franklin D. Roosevelt on the resettlement of refugees from Nazi Germany, April 13, 1938

Following the war, there was much interest and preparation within the Jewish community for the forthcoming Paris Peace Conference, by groups both supportive and opposed to the concept of a Jewish homeland in Palestine. In March 1919, as President Woodrow Wilson was leaving for the Conference, Morgenthau was among 31 prominent Jewish Americans to sign an anti-Zionist petition presented by U.S. Congressman Julius Kahn; he and many other prominent Jewish representatives attended the Conference. Morgenthau served as an advisor regarding Eastern Europe and the Middle East, and later worked with war-related charitable bodies, including the Relief Committee for the Middle East, the Greek Refugee Settlement Commission and the American Red Cross. In 1919, he headed the United States government fact-finding mission to Poland, which produced the Morgenthau Report. In 1920, he was nominated as ambassador to Mexico, but was never confirmed as Warren G. Harding was elected president later that year. In 1933, he was an American representative at the Geneva Conference.

== Death ==
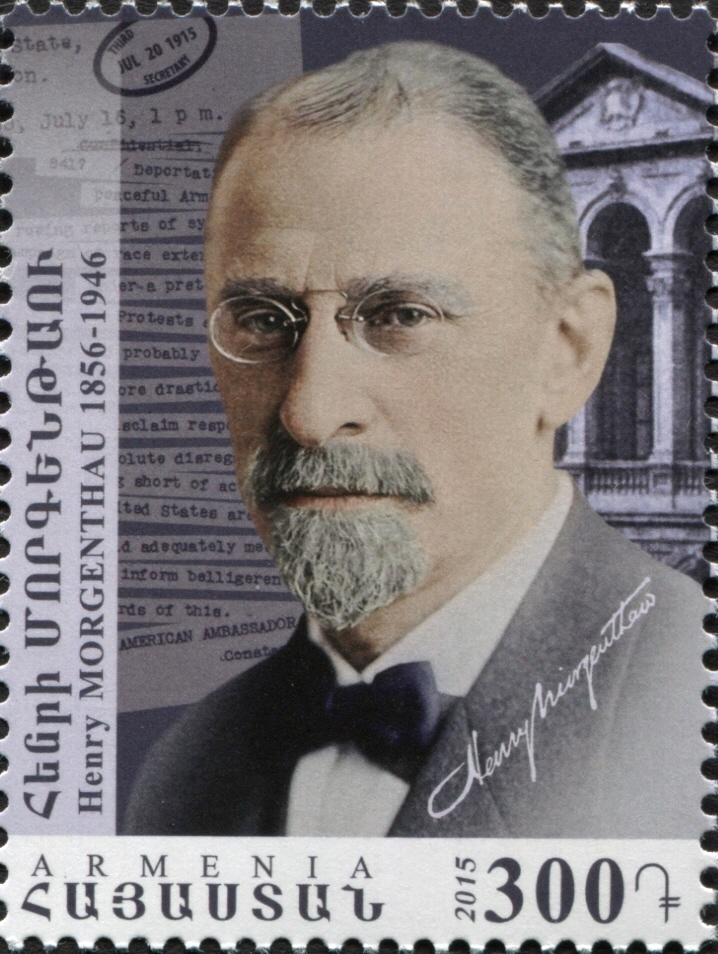
Morgenthau on a 2015 Armenian stamp from the series "Centennial of the Armenian Genocide". In the background is the telegram (in strip form pasted onto a page) pictured above.

Morgenthau died in 1946 at age 90 following a cerebral hemorrhage, in New York City, and was buried in Hawthorne, New York. His son Henry Morgenthau Jr. was a Secretary of the Treasury from 1934 to July 1945. His daughter, Alma Wertheim, had married banker Maurice Wertheim in 1909 and was the mother of historian Barbara Tuchman. His daughter Ruth Morgenthau was married to banker George W. Naumburg (son of Elkan Naumburg), and then John Knight.

== All in a Life-Time gallery ==
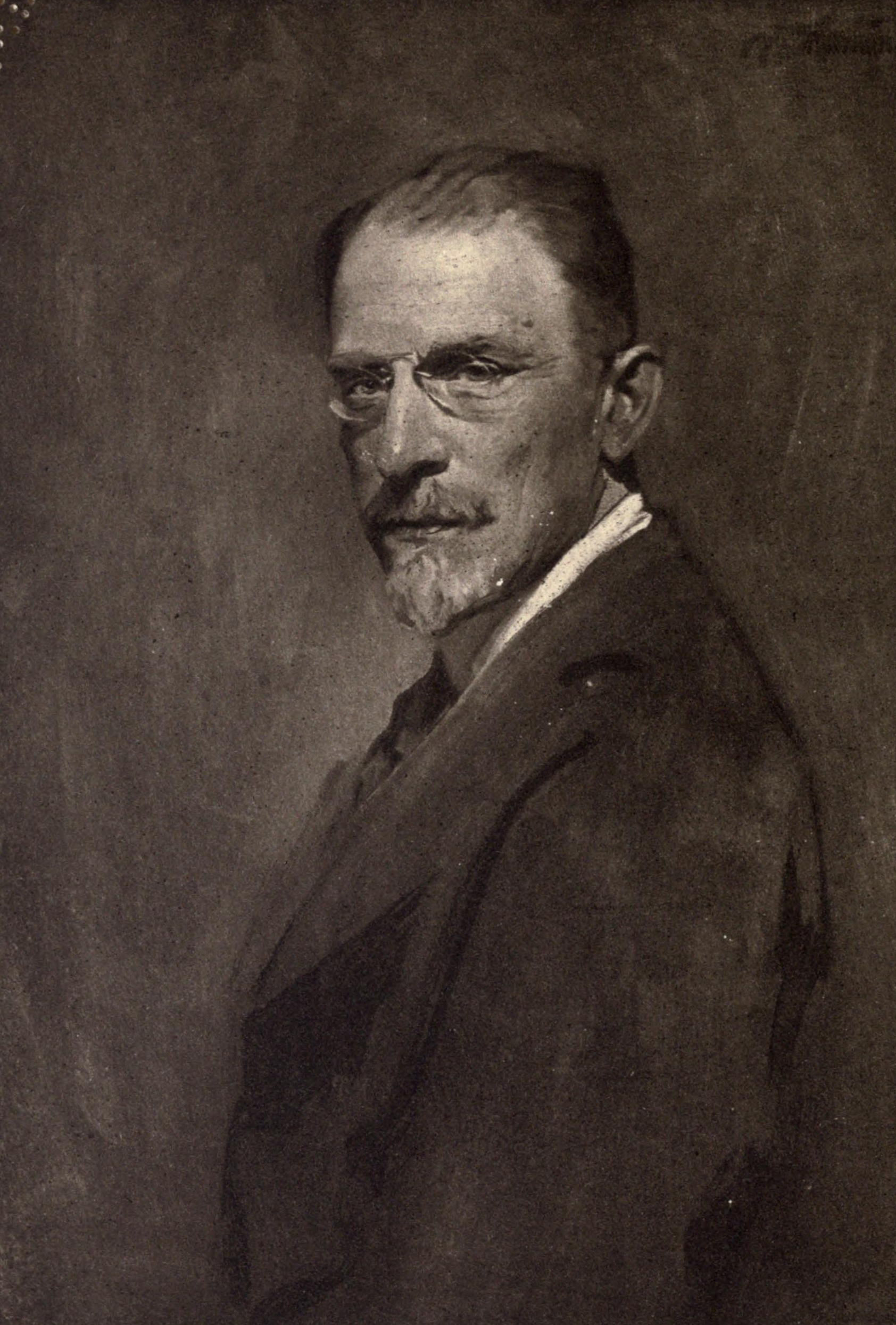
Henry Morgenthau

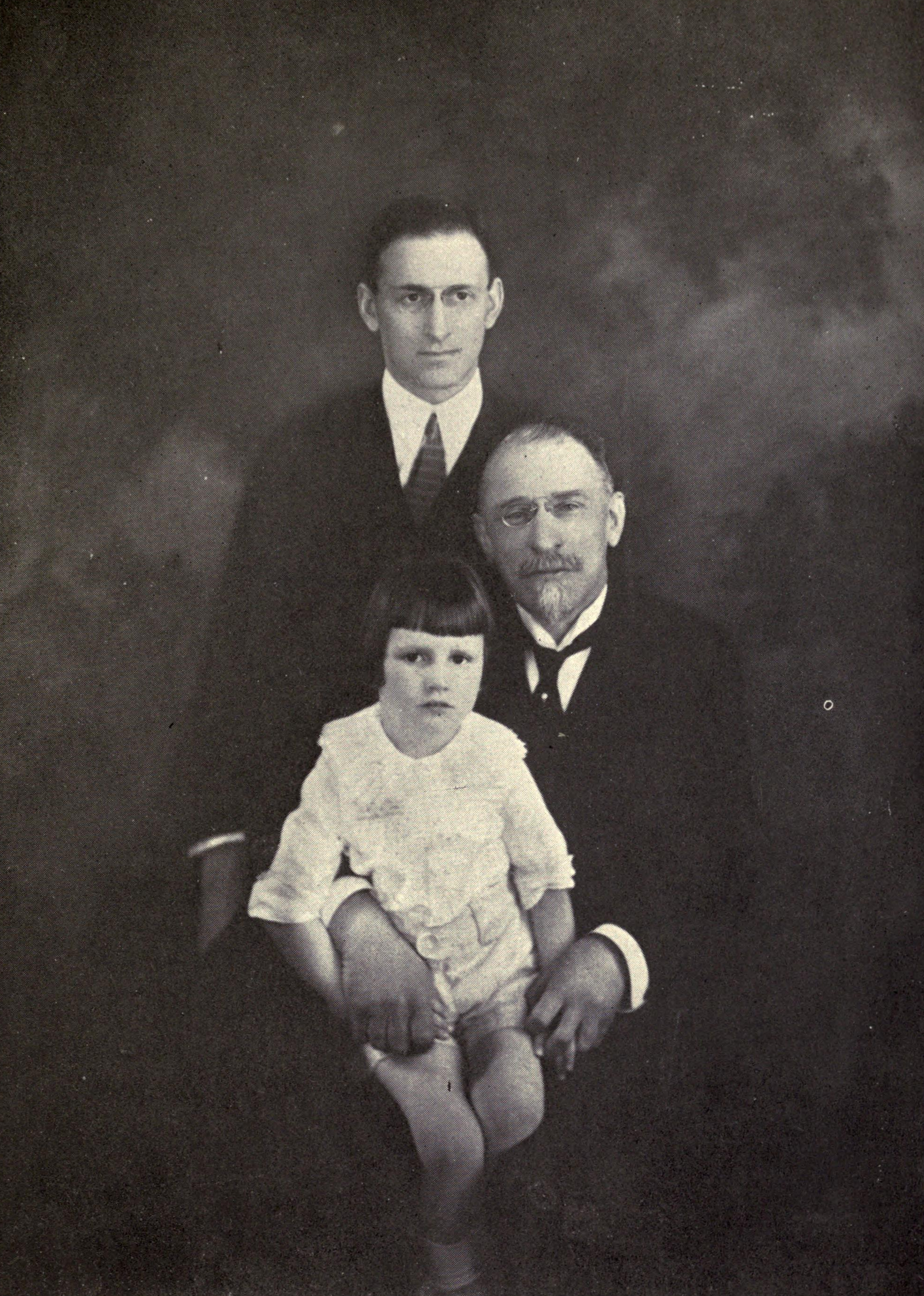
Mr. Morgenthau playfully refers to this picture as the Morgenthau dynasty

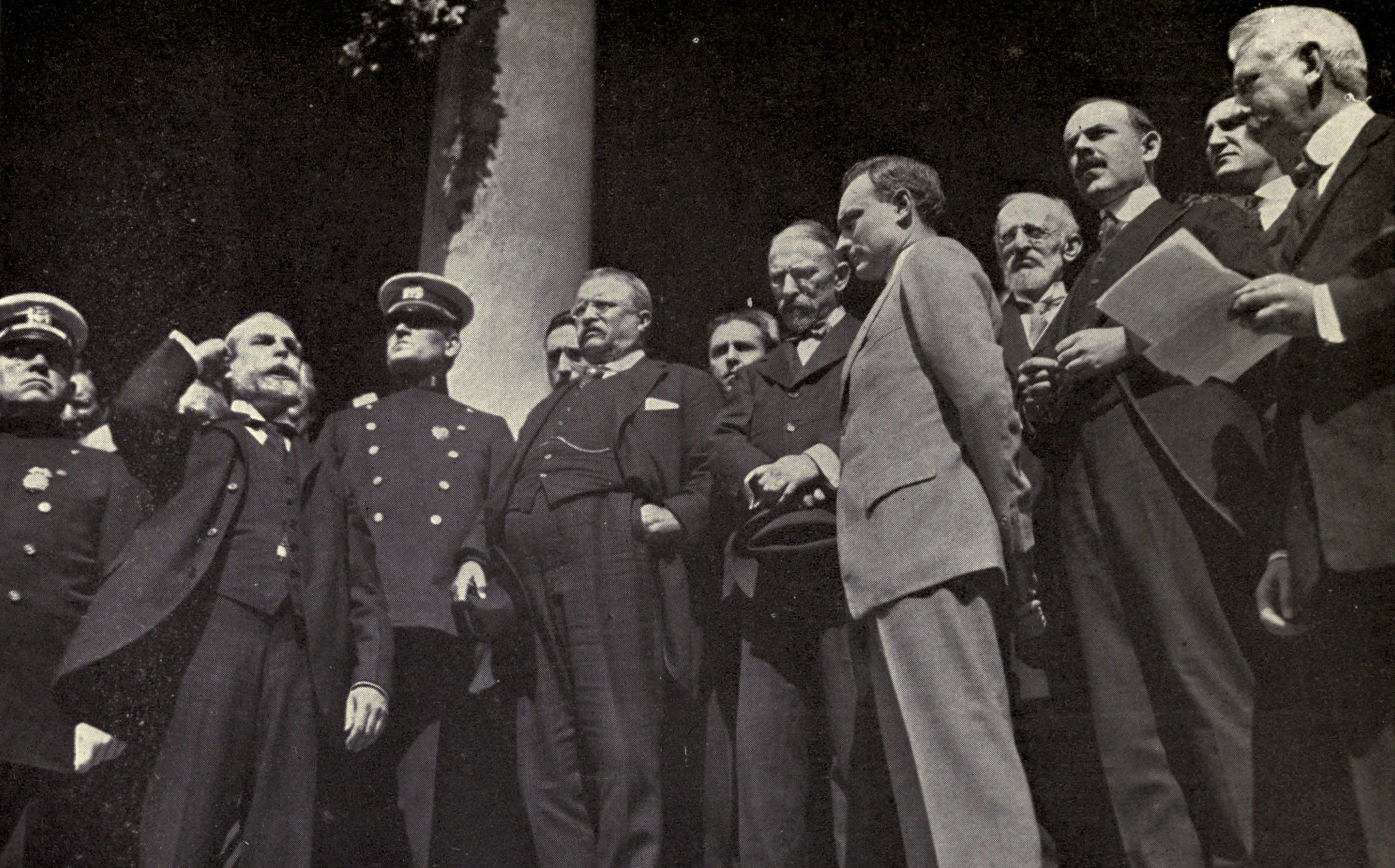
Mr. Morgenthau with Theodore Roosevelt, Charles E. Hughes, Oscar Straus, and other distinguished citizens on the steps of the City Hall of New York, urging Mayor Mitchel to accept a renomination

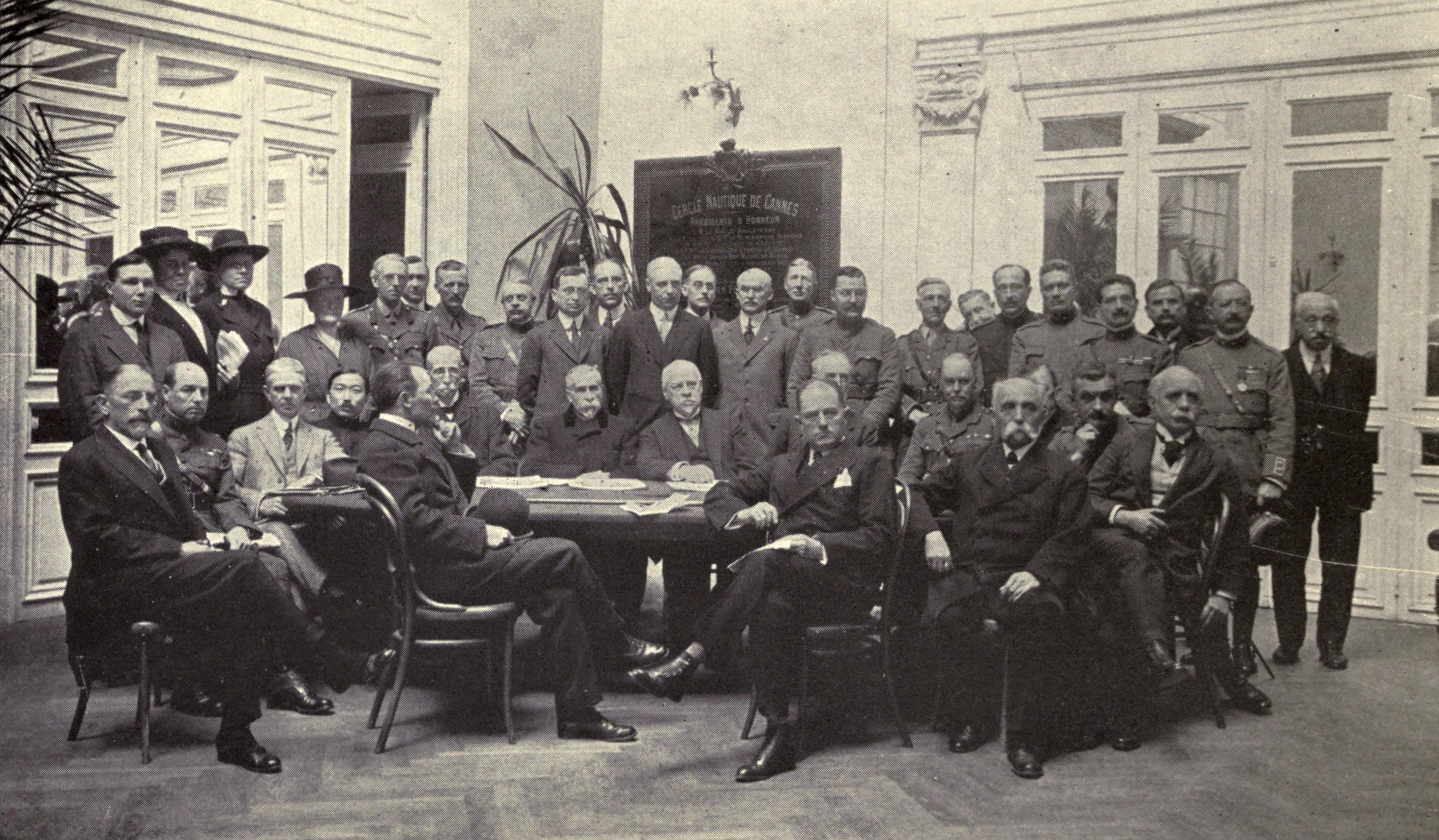
Mr. Morgenthau as one of the group of financiers, doctors, and sociologists who organized the international association of Red Cross societies at Cannes in 1919

== Selected works ==
Morgenthau published several books. The Library of Congress holds some 30,000 documents from his personal papers, including:

- Ambassador Morgenthau's Story (1918). Garden City, N.Y.: Doubleday (online).
- Secrets of the Bosphorus (1918) (online)
- The Morgenthau Report (October 3, 1919) concerning the plight of Jews in the Second Polish Republic.
- All in a Lifetime (Garden City, New York: Doubleday, Page & Co, 1925), 454 pages, 7 illustrations; featuring the Morgenthau Report (online, at Archive.org).
- I was sent to Athens (1929) deals with his time working with Greek refugees (openlibrary.org)
- The Murder of a Nation (1974). With preface by W. N. Medlicott. New York: Armenian General Benevolent Union of America.

Articles

- "Zionism a Surrender, Not a Solution". The World's Work. XLII (3): i–viii. July 1921.

Diaries

- United States Diplomacy on the Bosphorus: The Diaries of Ambassador Morgenthau, 1913–1916 (2004). Compiled with an introduction by Ara Sarafian. London: Taderon Press (Gomidas Institute). ISBN 1-903656-40-0.

Official documents

- Ara Sarafian (ed.): United States Official Records on the Armenian Genocide. 1915–1917 (2004). London and Princeton: Gomidas Institute. ISBN 1-903656-39-7

== Depictions ==
In Terry George's 2016 drama The Promise, set in the final years of the Ottoman Empire, Morgenthau is played by James Cromwell.

== See also ==
- Leslie Davis, American diplomat and wartime US consul to Harput
- Witnesses and testimonies of the Armenian genocide

Diplomatic posts
Preceded by William W. Rockhill	United States Ambassador to Turkey; 1913–1916	Succeeded by Abram I. Elkus
