= Rafe Pomerance =

American environmentalist (1946–2026)

- Born: July 19, 1946; New York City, U.S.
- Died: May 21, 2026 (aged 79); Washington, D.C., U.S.
- Education: B.A. Cornell University
- Spouse: Lenore Markwett Pomerance
- Children: 3
- Relatives: Maurice Wertheim (grandfather); Henry Morgenthau Sr. (great-grandfather)

Rafe Pomerance (July 19, 1946 – May 21, 2026) was an American environmentalist. He was a distinguished senior Arctic policy fellow of the Woodwell Climate Research Center. Beginning in the late 1970s, he played a key role in raising awareness of the risks of climate change for United States policy-makers. His role during the period 1979 to 1989 is detailed in the book Losing Earth by Nathaniel Rich.

== Early life and education ==
Pomerance was born in New York City on July 19, 1946, and grew up in Cos Cob, Connecticut, the son of peace activist Josephine (née Wertheim) and architect Ralph Pomerance. He was a grandson of Maurice Wertheim and Alma Morgenthau, and great-grandson of Henry Morgenthau Sr. He was of Jewish heritage.

He graduated from Cornell University in 1968, with a B.A. in History.

== Career ==
After graduating from Cornell University, Pomerance served in the poverty program as a VISTA volunteer working for the Virginia Welfare Rights Organization. He began his environmental career in 1972 working for the Urban Environment Conference under Senator Phil Hart where they worked on issues of lead in gasoline and reforming the highway trust fund (to include support of mass transit). In 1973 he launched the National Clean Air Coalition and became its coordinator for 5 years.

Pomerance joined the Friends of the Earth in 1975 lobbying for clean air and was its president for four years until 1984. From 1986 to 1993, he served as a Senior Associate for climate change and ozone depletion at the World Resources Institute.

In 1993, he was appointed Deputy Assistant Secretary of State for Environment and Development under U.S. president Bill Clinton. In this role he was involved in negotiations on forestry, GMOs, the international coral reef initiative, and climate change leading to the Kyoto Protocol. He left the department in 1999 and founded a non-profit, Climate Policy Center where he led a successful effort to get the Federal Government to found the Advanced Research Projects Agency - Energy, which was signed into law in 2007.

He was an advisor to Rethink Energy Florida and their project "Keep Florida Above Water".

From 2015 to 2019 he served on the Polar Research Board of the U.S. National Academy of Sciences. In 2014 he launched Arctic 21, a network of organizations committed to communicating the unraveling of the Arctic.

Pomerance served as the President of the Board of American Rivers, and Chairman of the Board of both the League of Conservation Voters and the Potomac Conservancy.

Pomerance is portrayed by Evan Peters in the 2026 Tom McCarthy film A Statement.

== Climate change activism ==
Pomerance first became interested in climate change after reading a 1978 EPA report, Environmental Assessment of Coal Liquefaction: Annual Report. The EPA report mentions "a report by the National Academy of Sciences (NAS) which warns that continued use of fossil fuels as a primary energy source for more than 20 to 30 more years could result in increased atmospheric levels of carbon dioxide. The greenhouse effect and associate global temperature increase and resulting climate changes could, according to NAS be both 'significant and damaging.'" Reading these words led Pomerance to contact a number of scientists for answers. He teamed up with scientist Gordon MacDonald and began scheduling meetings with government officials to discuss the issue of climate change. Their meeting with top White House scientist, Frank Press, prompted a National Academy of Sciences study, "Carbon Dioxide and Climate: A Scientific Assessment", informally known as the Charney report, the first National Academy assessment that attempted to quantify the impacts of increased CO_{2} on the climate.

He joined the World Resources Institute in 1986 and continued to attempt to fight for climate change policy. He and Gus Speth convinced Senator John Chafee to hold the June 10 and 11, 1986, hearings on “Ozone Depletion, the Greenhouse Effect, and Climate Change", with James Hansen being the key witness. Hansen's testimony at this hearing and his 1988 Senate testimony Chaired by Senator Tim Wirth, on the effects of climate change are now regarded as a turning point in the public's awareness of the issue. Press coverage of these hearings was extensive, resulting in higher public awareness of the issue.

In 1988, at the Toronto "Changing Atmosphere: Implications for Global Security" conference, Pomerance and others suggested proposing a concrete goal. There was vigorous debate in the conference plenary but this target became a centerpiece of the final conference statement. The words were "Reduce CO2 emissions by approximately 20% of 1988 levels by the year 2005 as an initial global goal". It became internationally known as a target for emission reductions.

In 2023 he articulated a vision of setting a limit on sea level rise, as a way of making climate change goals more tangible. These views were described in "The Case for Capping Sea Level Rise". As of 2025, Pomerance still spoke about the importance of sea level rise and the ongoing melt of the Greenland Ice Sheet.

Pomerance is considered by the Climate Institute one of the "unsung heroes of the climate wars". His lobbying efforts in the 1980s were the subject of a 2018 New York Times article entitled "Losing Earth: The Decade We Almost Stopped Climate Change". The article brought significant attention to his past work. His views about the evolving debate over climate change policy are summarized in a 2020 interview by Nancy Rosenblum the title of which was a phrase coined by Pomerance: "The Fate of Greenland is the Fate of Miami."

== Personal life and death ==
Pomerance was married to the former Lenore Markwett Cooley, and helped raise her son Ben. Together they had a daughter Lilah and a son Ethan. He lived in Washington, D.C., for over 50 years. He died in Washington of lung cancer on May 21, 2026, at the age of 79.
