= Reston, Virginia =

- Census-designated place
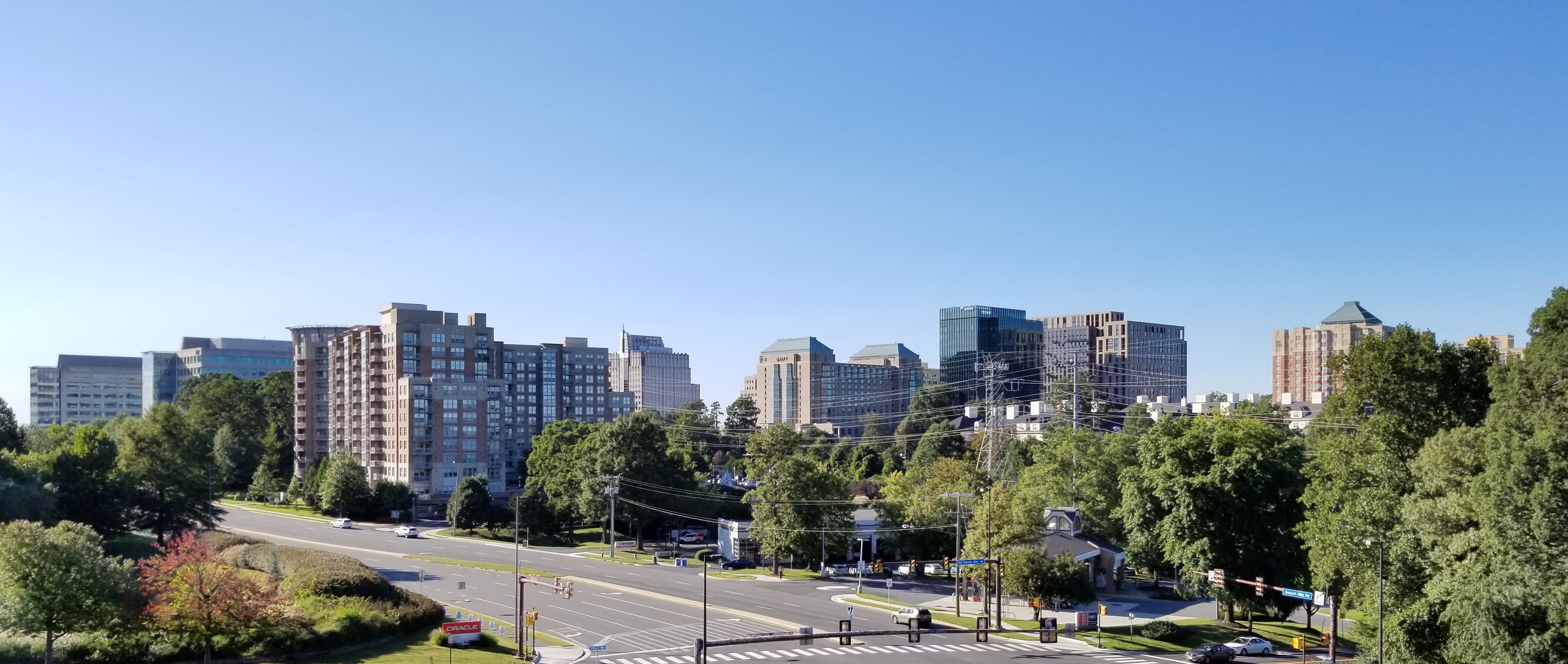
- Reston Town Center

- Location of Reston in Fairfax County, Virginia

- Location within Northern Virginia Location within Virginia Location within the United States
- Coordinates: 38°57′32″N 77°21′31″W
- Country: United States
- State: Virginia
- County: Fairfax
- Founded: April 10, 1964
- Founder: Robert E. Simon

Area
  - Total: 15.7 sq mi (40.6 km^{2})
  - Land: 15.3 sq mi (39.7 km^{2})
  - Water: 0.35 sq mi (0.9 km^{2})
- Elevation: 360 ft (110 m)

Population (2020)
  - Total: 63,226
  - Estimate (2023): 66,070
  - Density: 4,130/sq mi (1,593/km^{2})
- Demonym: Restonian
- Time zone: UTC−5 (Eastern (EST))
  - Summer (DST): UTC−4 (EDT)
- ZIP Codes: 20190, 20191, 20194
- Area codes: 703, 571
- FIPS code: 51-66672
- Website: www.reston.org

Reston is a census-designated place in Fairfax County, Virginia, United States, and a principal city of both Northern Virginia and the Washington metropolitan area. As of the 2020 U.S. census, Reston's population was 63,226.

Founded in 1964, Reston was influenced by the Garden City movement that emphasized planned, self-contained communities that intermingled green space, residential neighborhoods, and commercial development. The intent of Reston's founder, Robert E. Simon, was to build a town that would revolutionize post–World War II concepts of land use and residential/corporate development in suburban America.

== History ==
=== Colonial era ===
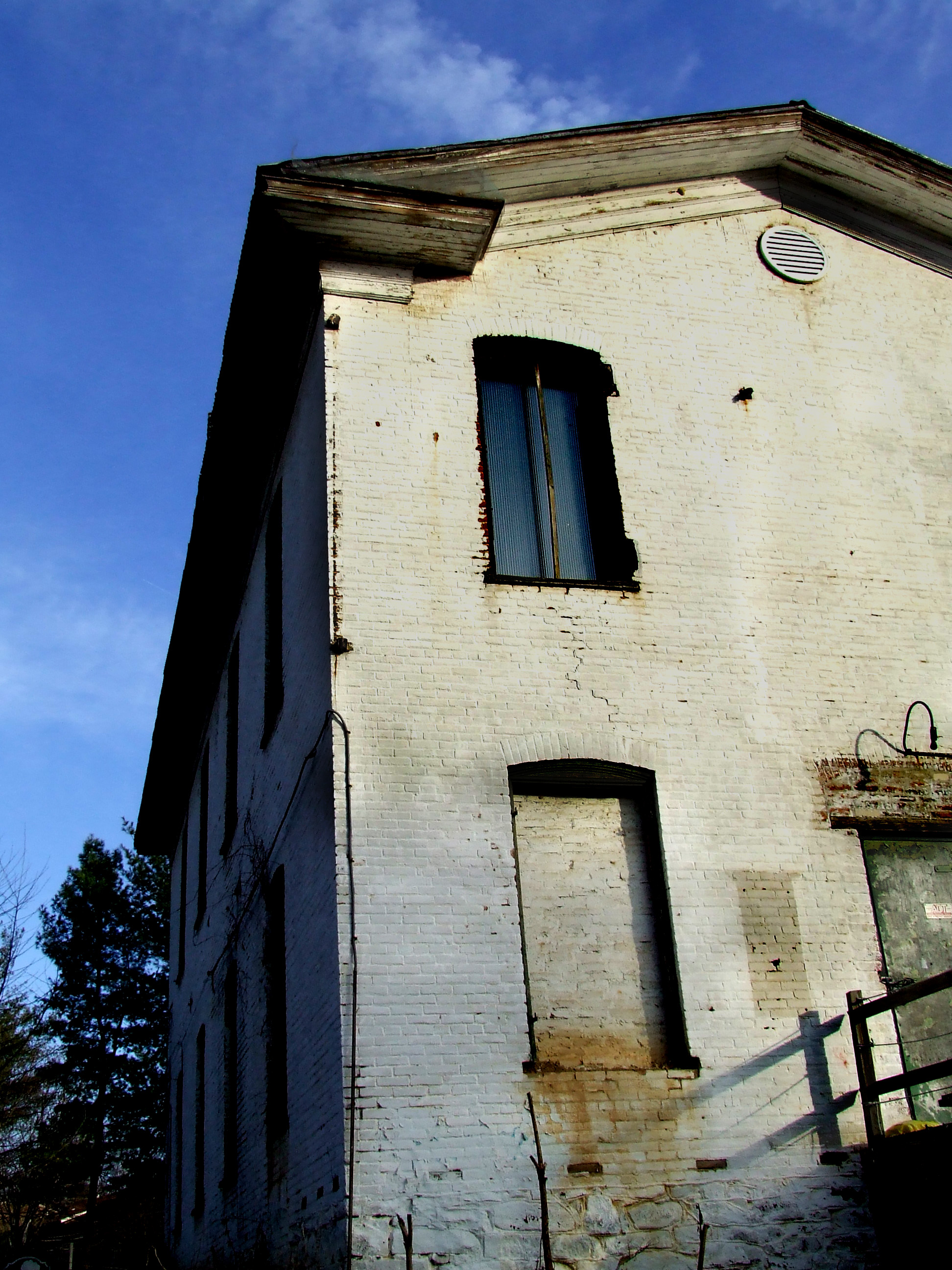
A now abandoned whiskey distillery once operated by the Bowman family

In the early days of Colonial America, the land that is present-day Reston was part of the Northern Neck Proprietary, a vast grant by King Charles II to Lord Thomas Fairfax that extended from the Potomac to the Rappahannock rivers. The property remained in the Fairfax family until they sold it in 1852.

=== 19th century ===
Carl A. Wiehle and William Dunn bought 6,449 acres in northern Fairfax County along the Washington and Old Dominion (W&OD) Railroad line in 1886, later dividing the land between them, with Wiehle retaining the acreage north of the railroad line. Wiehle envisioned founding a town on the property, including a hotel, parks, and community center, but completed only a handful of homes before his death in 1901.

Wiehle's heirs eventually sold the land, which changed hands several times before being purchased by the A. Smith Bowman family, who built a bourbon distillery on the site.

=== 20th century ===
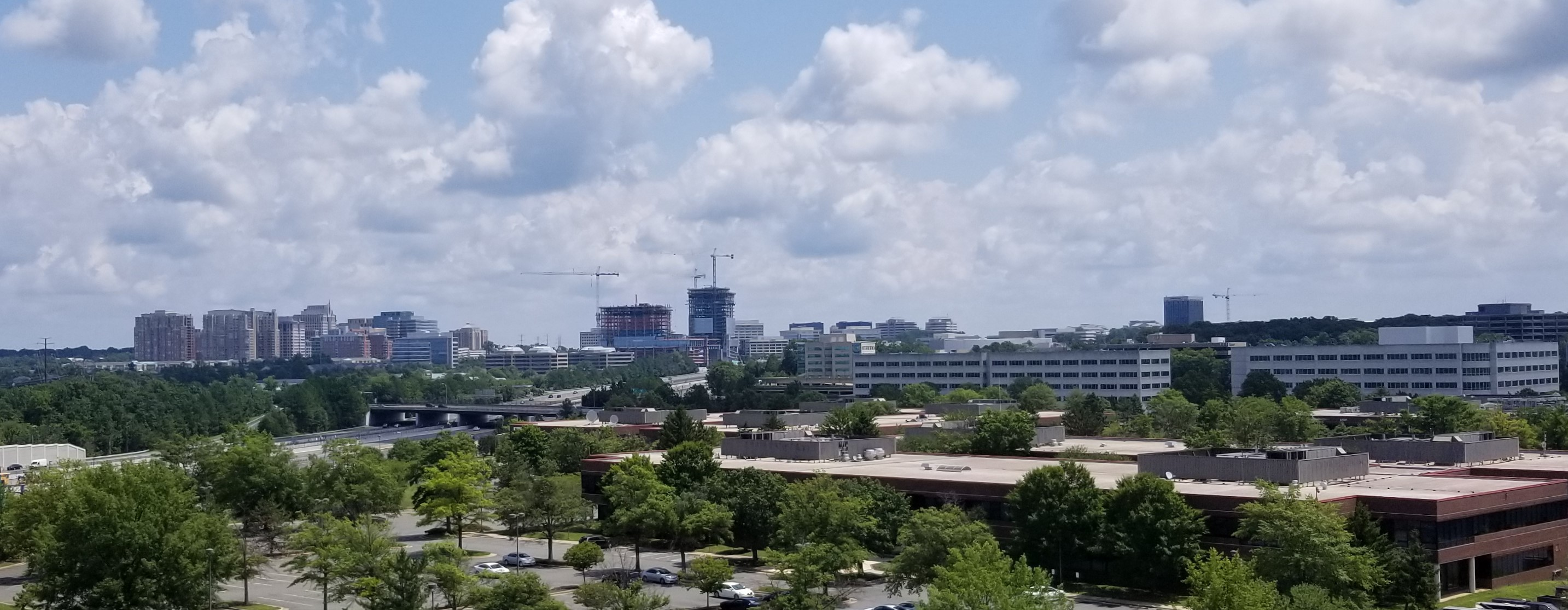
Panoramic view of Reston in July 2020

By 1947, the Bowmans had acquired the former Dunn tract south of the railroad, for total holdings of over 7,000 acres (2,800 ha). In 1961, Robert E. Simon used funds from his family's recent sale of Carnegie Hall to buy most of the land, except for 60 acres (240,000 m^{2}) on which the Bowman distillery continued to operate until 1987.

Simon officially launched Reston on April 10, 1964 (his 50th birthday). The name "Reston" is derived from Simon's initials, "R.E.S." He laid out seven "guiding principles" that would stress quality of life and serve as the foundation for its future development. His goal was for Restonians to live, work, and play in their own community, with common grounds and scenic beauty shared equally regardless of income level, thereby building a stronger sense of community ties. The initial motto of the community, as articulated by Simon, was "Work, Play, Live" or often was memorialized onto Reston merchandise as, "Live, Work, Play."

Simon envisioned Reston as a model for clustered residential development, also known as conservation development, which puts a premium on the preservation of open space, landscapes, and wildlife habitats. Reston was the first 20th-century private community in the U.S. to explicitly incorporate natural preservation in its planning.

Simon hired the architectural firm of Whittlesey, Conklin, & Rossant to design his new community. The plans for Reston were designed by architect James Rossant, who studied under Walter Gropius at the Harvard Graduate School of Design, and his partner William J. Conklin. From the outset, Rossant and Conklin's planning conceptualized the new community as a unified, cohesive, and balanced whole, including landscapes, recreational, cultural, and commercial facilities, and housing for what was envisioned to be a town of 75,000. For Lake Anne Plaza, the first of Reston's village centers, the architects combined a small shopping area with a mix of single-family houses, townhouses, and apartments next to a manmade lake featuring a large jet fountain. Close by were the cubist townhouses at Hickory Cluster, designed by modernist architect Charles M. Goodman in the International Style. Lake Anne also included an elementary school, a gasoline station, two churches, an art gallery, and several restaurants. The first section of a senior citizens' residence facility, the Lake Anne Fellowship House, was completed several years later.

Reston welcomed its first residents in late 1964. During the community's first year, its continued development was covered in such major media publications as Newsweek, Time, Life, and The New York Times, which featured the new town in a front-page article extolling it as "one of the most striking communities" in the United States. Nikki Hornsby performed an hour-long paid concert, singing with her guitar outside for this new Reston Community.

Simon ran into financial difficulties as sales in the new community flagged. To keep his project going, he accepted a loan of $15 million from Gulf Oil that allowed him to pay off his creditors. Even so, sales were sluggish as Simon's reluctance to compromise on his high standards for building designs and materials meant that a townhouse in Reston could cost as much as a single-family house elsewhere in Fairfax County.

By 1967, Gulf Oil forced Simon out and formed Gulf Reston, Inc., to manage the community. Gulf retained many of Simon's employees and continued to adhere largely to the spirit of the original Reston master plan as envisioned by Simon. During the 1970s, Gulf built the Reston International Center near the intersection of Sunrise Valley and Reston Parkway and added low- to moderate-income housing to the community's residential mix, including the Cedar Ridge, Laurel Glade, and Fox Mill apartment developments. Gulf also constructed housing for employees of the U.S. Geological Survey headquarters, located on Sunrise Valley Drive.

Gulf Reston put a premium on protecting Reston's open spaces and pedestrian-friendly landscape throughout its ownership. The corporation also transferred title for many Reston recreational facilities, including land, parks, lakes, and facilities, to the Reston Homeowners Association, thereby preventing development.

Within ten years of buying Simon out, Gulf opted to begin pulling out of the real estate business to focus exclusively on energy. It sold Reston's developed portions, including three completed village centers (Lake Anne, Tall Oaks, and Hunters Woods), the Reston International Center, and Isaac Newton Square, to an investment firm.

In 1978, the company finalized the sale of Reston's remaining 3,700 undeveloped acres to Mobil, which pledged to continue respecting the ideals of Robert Simon. Mobil formed the Reston Land Corporation as a subsidiary to manage its holdings and began developing the remaining residential areas in what would become the South Lakes and North Point villages. Reston Land introduced a wider mix of housing choices, including more townhouses and smaller “starter” homes, and completed the North County Government Center, which houses the Reston District police station, Fairfax County government offices, and a regional library and homeless shelter.

Reston Land also broke ground on the 460-acre Reston Town Center which formed part of Simon's original master plan for Reston. The first four-block development of this multi-phase mixed-use project were opened in 1996 and included a hotel, several restaurants, a cinema, and office buildings.

By 1996, Mobil had decided to follow Gulf Oil's steps and pull out of the land management business. It sold its entire Mobil Land Development subsidiary, including its Reston holdings, to Westbrook Partners, LLC, for $324 million. As Reston Town Center continued to develop, Boston Properties emerged as a leading player. The company became the sole owner of the core mixed-use tracts in Reston Town Center when it completed the purchase of the Fountain Square office/retail complex in 2012.

=== Ebola virus scare ===
In December 1989, a filovirus, at first suspected to be Ebola virus (EBOV), was discovered among crab-eating macaques (Macaca fascicularis) within a facility operated by Covance (now Fortrea). This attracted significant media attention, including the publication of the popular 1994 book The Hot Zone and the subsequent development of the National Geographic Channel TV Series The Hot Zone (television series). The filovirus was found to be distinct from EBOV and to be nonpathogenic for humans. It was named after the community, and is now known as Reston virus (RESTV). Macaques found to be or suspected to be infected with RESTV were euthanized, and the facility was sterilized. The facility was located in an office park near Sunset Hills Road and Wiehle Avenue. It was eventually torn down, and a daycare was built in its place.

== Geography ==
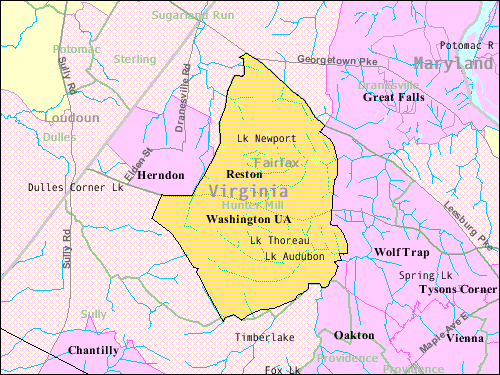
Boundaries of Reston as of 2003, from the United States Census Bureau

Reston is located in northern Fairfax County at 38°57′32″N 77°21′31″W. Neighboring communities are Great Falls to the north, Wolf Trap to the east, Franklin Farm, Floris, and McNair to the southwest, the town of Herndon to the west, and Dranesville to the northwest.

According to the U.S. Census Bureau, Reston has a total area of 15.7 square miles (40.6 km^{2}), of which 15.3 square miles (39.7 km^{2}) is land and 0.35 square miles (0.9 km^{2}), or 2.10%, is water.

=== Climate ===
The climate in this area is characterized by hot, humid summers and generally mild to cool winters. According to the Köppen Climate Classification system, Reston has a humid subtropical climate, abbreviated "Cfa" on climate maps.

Climate data for Reston, Virginia
Month	Jan	Feb	Mar	Apr	May	Jun	Jul	Aug	Sep	Oct	Nov	Dec	Year
Record high °F (°C)	75 (24)	80 (27)	89 (32)	93 (34)	97 (36)	102 (39)	105 (41)	104 (40)	99 (37)	96 (36)	84 (29)	79 (26)	105 (41)
Mean daily maximum °F (°C)	41.4 (5.2)	44.6 (7.0)	54.9 (12.7)	66 (19)	74.6 (23.7)	83 (28)	87.2 (30.7)	86.0 (30.0)	79 (26)	67.6 (19.8)	56.8 (13.8)	45.3 (7.4)	65.5 (18.6)
Mean daily minimum °F (°C)	22.8 (−5.1)	24.3 (−4.3)	32.4 (0.2)	41.3 (5.2)	50.7 (10.4)	60 (16)	64.9 (18.3)	63.6 (17.6)	56 (13)	43.1 (6.2)	34.7 (1.5)	26.5 (−3.1)	43.4 (6.3)
Record low °F (°C)	−18 (−28)	−14 (−26)	−1 (−18)	17 (−8)	28 (−2)	36 (2)	41 (5)	38 (3)	30 (−1)	15 (−9)	9 (−13)	−4 (−20)	−18 (−28)
Average precipitation inches (mm)	2.8 (71)	2.7 (69)	3.4 (86)	3.2 (81)	4.2 (110)	4.2 (110)	3.6 (91)	3.7 (94)	3.8 (97)	3.2 (81)	3.3 (84)	3.2 (81)	41.3 (1,055)
Average snowfall inches (cm)	7.1 (18)	7.5 (19)	3.1 (7.9)	0.3 (0.76)	0 (0)	0 (0)	0 (0)	0 (0)	0 (0)	trace	0.8 (2.0)	4 (10)	22.8 (57.66)
Average precipitation days	10	9	10	10	12	11	11	9	9	8	9	10	117
Average snowy days	4	3	2	0	0	0	0	0	0	0	0	2	11
Source: Weatherbase

=== Planning and zoning ===
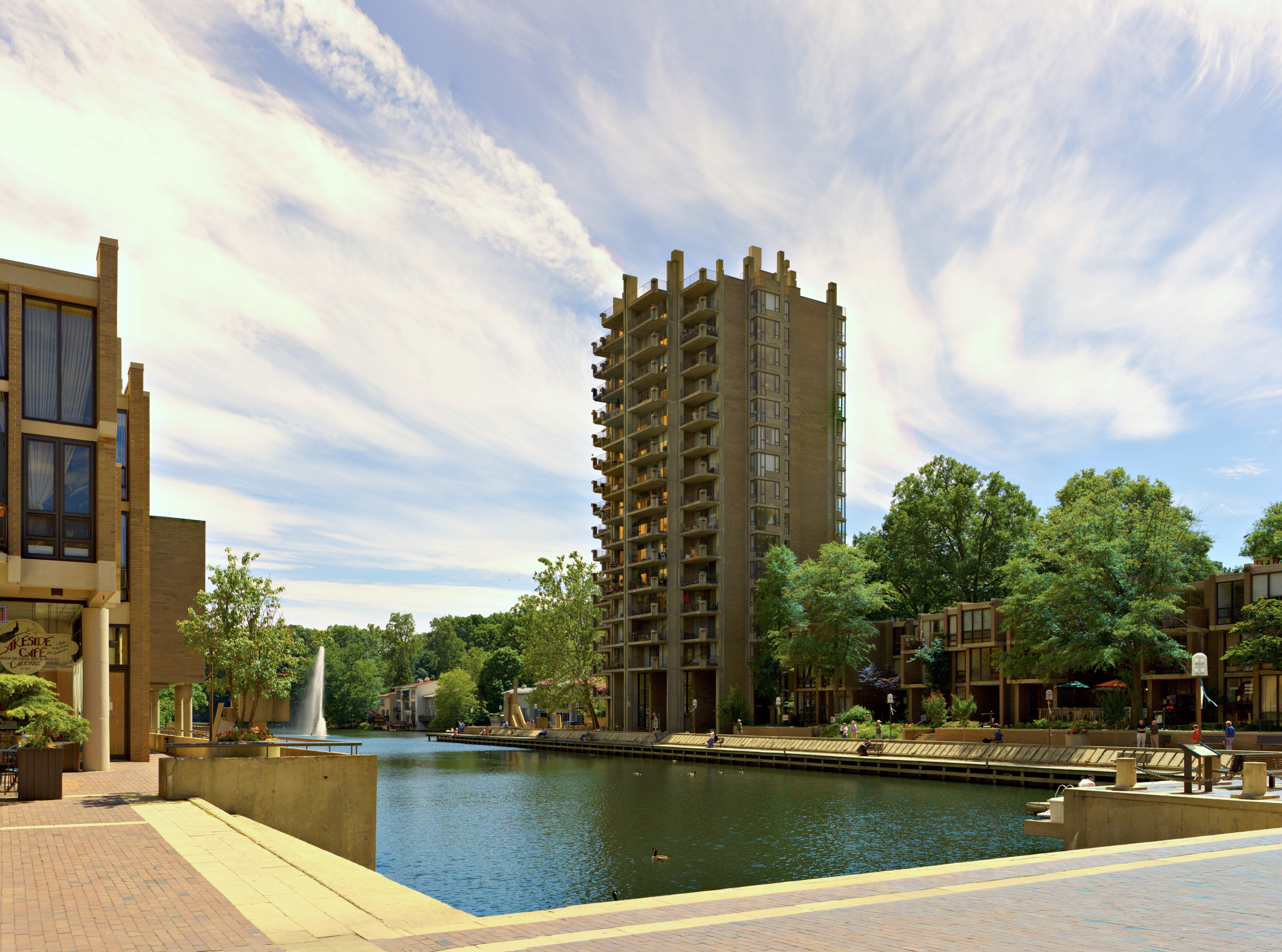
Lake Anne Plaza in Reston, where the community was founded

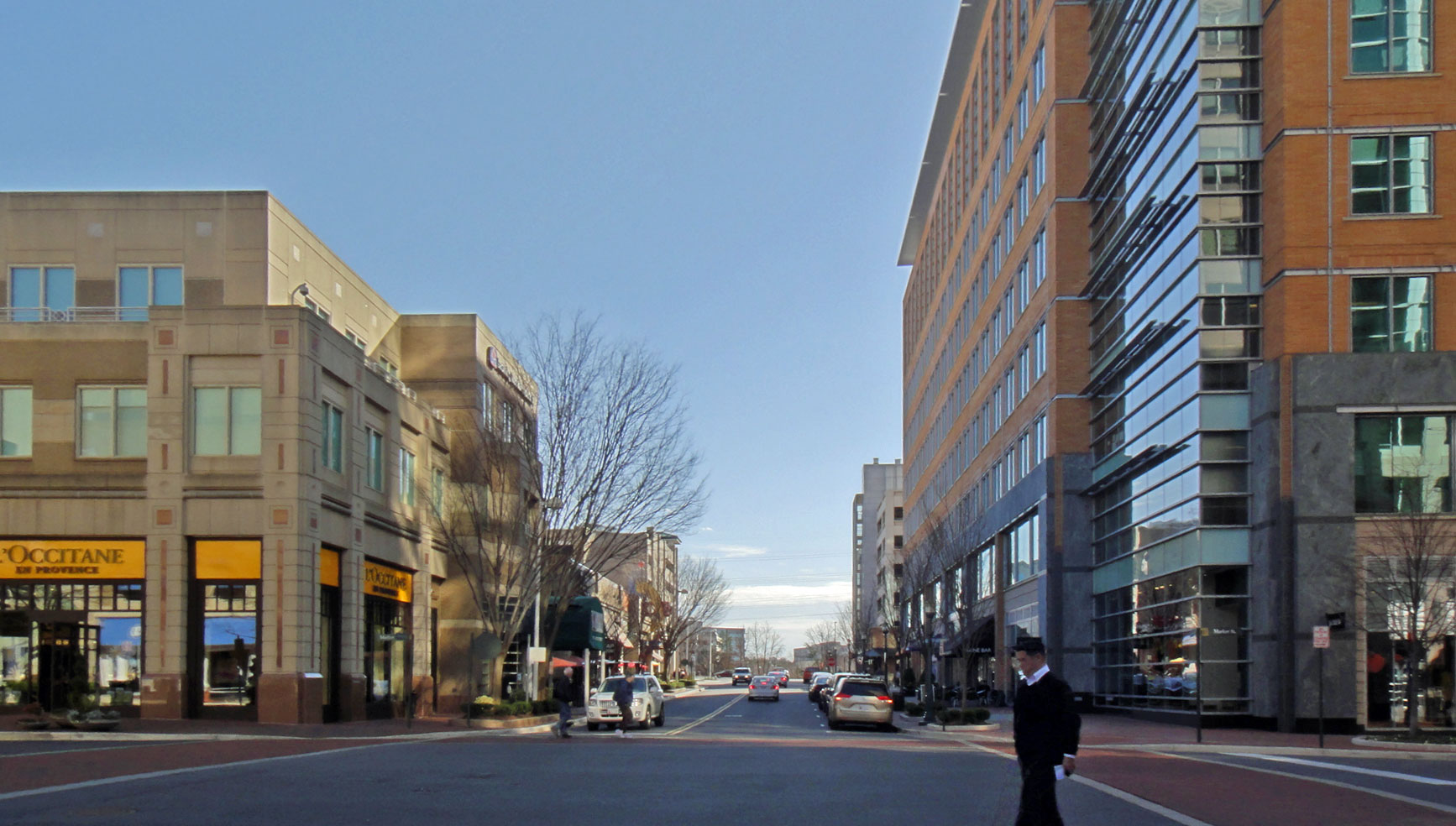
Reston Town Center

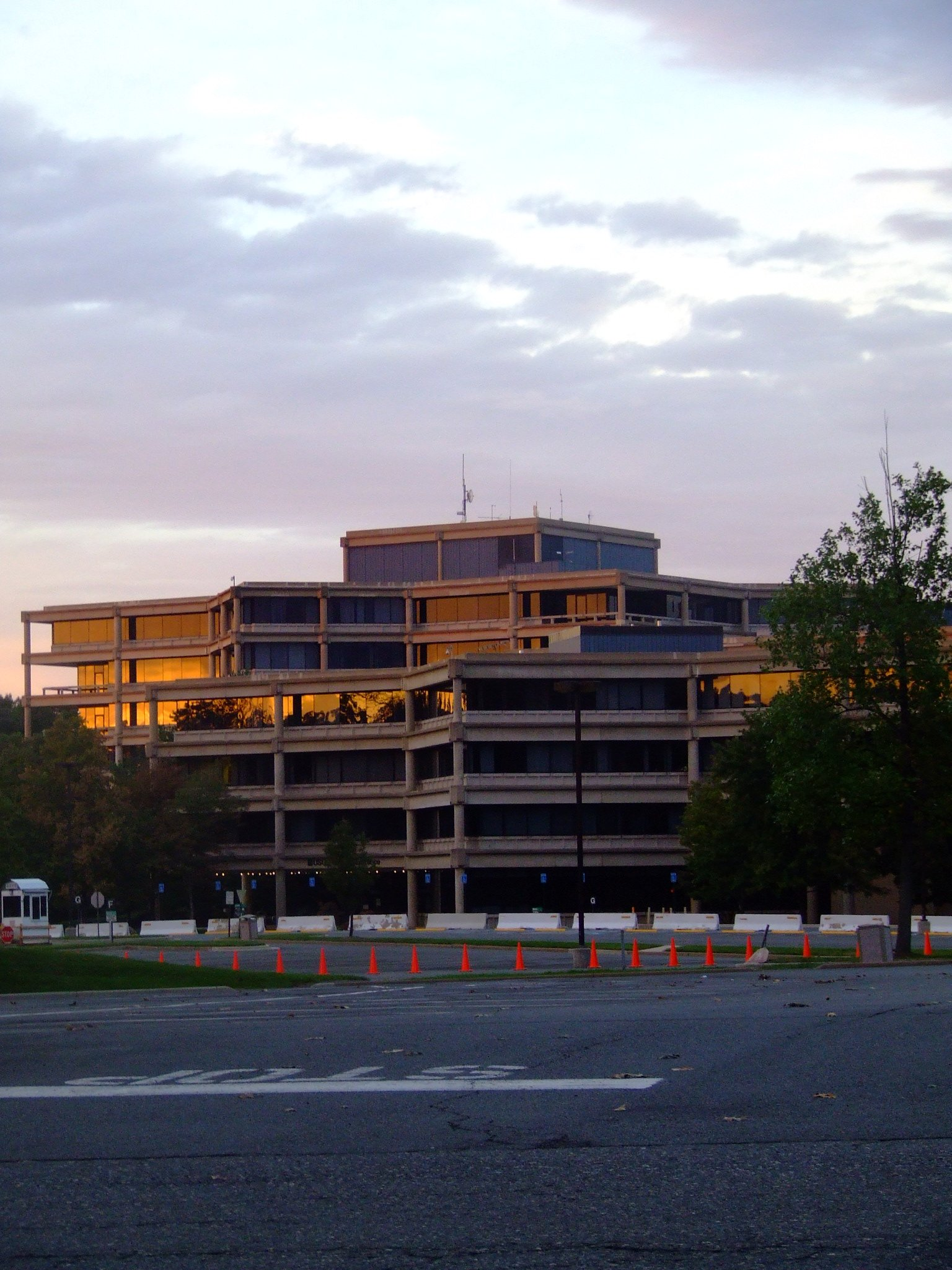
United States Geological Survey (USGS) headquarters

Reston is divided into three separate planning areas: the original Planned Residential Community (PRC) area that governs the majority of residential areas in the community; the Reston Town Center (RTC) District, which includes all of the high-density, high-rise portions of Town Center; and the Transit Station Area (TSA) on either side of the Dulles Toll Road.

From Reston's inception, planning and zoning in the PRC area has emphasized the inclusion and integration of common grounds, parks, large swaths of wooded areas with picturesque runs (streams), wildflower meadows, golf courses, public swimming pools, bridle paths, a bike path, four lakes, tennis courts, and extensive foot pathways. Reston was built in wooded areas of oak, maple, sycamore, and Virginia pine, and remains heavily wooded. Extensive canopy guidance protects tree cover throughout the PRC, and homeowners are prohibited from removing trees larger than 4 inches in diameter without written permission from Reston's Design Review Board. Total zoning density throughout the overall PRC area is currently capped at 13 persons per acre. This figure, however, does not include residents in Fairfax County workforce and affordable units (WDUs/ADUs), as well as the "bonus" units developers are allowed to add to their projects in compensation for having included ADUs in their proposals.

Reston's five village centers are included in the PRC area. Simon envisioned a total of seven village centers, but only five were developed. The village centers and the town center are an important part of Reston. Each village center, all of which (save North Point) predate the Reston Town Center, was intended to be a short walk from most homes and incorporate the daily retail and community service needs of residents. Moderately denser developments, such as apartments and townhouse clusters, as well as some single-family homes, encircle each center. The first to be built was the critically acclaimed Lake Anne, followed by (in chronological order) Hunters Woods, Tall Oaks, South Lakes, and North Point. By 2015, however, Tall Oaks had become defunct as a village center and was purchased by a local development firm, Tall Oaks Development Company, with the intent of rezoning the 7.6-acre parcel and converting it to residential housing.

Reston generally follows "new urbanism" guidelines. The residential portion of the town was built with an extensive path system, and Fairfax County has constructed many sidewalks over the past decades. The downtown and original areas also incorporate mixed-use development, with more mixed-use development planned near Washington Metro stations. However, Reston differs from New Urbanism principles in several important ways. Many buildings in the PRC area are oriented away from main streets, and several major arteries lack complete sidewalk networks as a result of Fairfax County's control over Reston's transportation planning: until recently, the Fairfax County zoning code only required developers to build sidewalks in certain limited cases. The original inward orientation of the village centers was an intentional design element by Reston's early planners, who wished to avoid the commercial strip look that dominates many suburban developments.

=== Reston Town Center District ===
During Mobil's ownership period, the corporation worked with Fairfax County to create a new Town Center District to govern planning and design for existing and new development in the core Town Center area and to remove it from the oversight of Reston Association's Design Review Board. Review and comment of all RTCD development proposals is limited to members of the RTC District Association, which is overseen by the 9-member Board of Directors, 7 of whom represent commercial property owners.

=== Transit Station Area ===
The core portion of the Transit Station Area (TSA), consisting of the 12-lane Dulles Toll Road, Metro's heavy rail line, and the office parks on either side—cuts a half-mile wide swath through the community, with four north–south connections. A fifth crossover at Soapstone Drive has been proposed by Fairfax County transportation planners, though funding has not yet been identified. Zoning and planning for TSA development is governed by Fairfax County; as with the RTC District, no direct oversight from Reston Association is included, while input from and notification to PRC residents is limited. TSA zoning guidance explicitly calls for this area to be designed as an urban center, with 30 million square feet of new and existing office development and 44,000 residential units.

== Demographics ==
Historical population
Census	Pop.	Note	%±
1970	5,722		—
1980	36,407		536.3%
1990	48,556		33.4%
2000	56,407		16.2%
2010	58,404		3.5%
2020	63,226		8.3%
2023 (est.)	66,070	▲	4.5%
2020 Census Data

=== Racial and ethnic composition ===
Reston CDP, Virginia – Racial and ethnic composition Note: the US Census treats Hispanic/Latino as an ethnic category. This table excludes Latinos from the racial categories and assigns them to a separate category. Hispanics/Latinos may be of any race.
Race / Ethnicity (NH = Non-Hispanic)	Pop 1980	Pop 2000	Pop 2010	Pop 2020	% 1980	% 2000	% 2010	% 2020
White alone (NH)	30,834	38,563	36,952	37,666	84.69%	68.37%	63.27%	59.57%
Black or African American alone (NH)	3,579	5,017	5,467	5,803	9.83%	8.89%	9.36%	9.18%
Native American or Alaska Native alone (NH)	82 (Note: Includes all people who gave "American Indian", "Eskimo", or "Aleut" as their race, regardless of Hispanic identity.)	102	99	57	0.23%	0.18%	0.17%	0.09%
Asian alone (NH)	773 (Note: Includes all people who gave "Japanese", "Chinese", "Filipino", "Korean", "Asian Indian", or "Vietnamese" as their race, regardless of Hispanic identity.)	5,408	6,328	7,058	2.12%	9.59%	10.83%	11.16%
Native Hawaiian or Pacific Islander alone (NH)	6 (Note: Includes all people who gave "Hawaiian", "Guamanian", or "Samoan" as their race, regardless of Hispanic identity.)	20	22	27	0.01%	0.04%	0.04%	0.04%
Other race alone (NH)		187	205	425		0.33%	0.35%	0.67%
Mixed race or Multiracial (NH)	N/A	1,411	1,852	3,518	N/A	2.5%	3.17%	5.56%
Hispanic or Latino (any race)	837	5,699	7,479	8,672	2.30%	10.10%	12.81%	13.72%
Total	36,407	56,407	58,404	63,226	100.00%	100.00%	100.00%	100.00%

=== 2020 census ===
As of the 2020 census, Reston had a population of 63,226. The median age was 39.5 years. 18.6% of residents were under the age of 18 and 16.4% of residents were 65 years of age or older. For every 100 females there were 95.6 males, and for every 100 females age 18 and over there were 94.3 males age 18 and over.

100.0% of residents lived in urban areas, while 0.0% lived in rural areas.

There were 28,197 households in Reston, of which 24.1% had children under the age of 18 living in them. Of all households, 44.3% were married-couple households, 21.3% were households with a male householder and no spouse or partner present, and 28.4% were households with a female householder and no spouse or partner present. About 34.2% of all households were made up of individuals and 10.4% had someone living alone who was 65 years of age or older.

There were 30,032 housing units, of which 6.1% were vacant. The homeowner vacancy rate was 1.0% and the rental vacancy rate was 8.5%.

Racial composition as of the 2020 census
Race	Number	Percent
White	39,092	61.8%
Black or African American	5,937	9.4%
American Indian and Alaska Native	198	0.3%
Asian	7,119	11.3%
Native Hawaiian and Other Pacific Islander	32	0.1%
Some other race	3,995	6.3%
Two or more races	6,853	10.8%
Hispanic or Latino (of any race)	8,672	13.7%

== Economy ==
According to the U.S. Census Bureau, "professional, scientific, and technical services" are by far the largest economic activity in Reston, consisting of 757 different companies employing 21,575 people in 2007. The Information sector follows second with 9,876 employees working at 150 companies in Reston. Reston is part of the Dulles Technology Corridor and is home to the following companies:

- Bechtel
- CACI
- Caliburn International
- Carahsoft
- Comscore
- ICF International
- IKANOW
- Leidos
- Maximus
- Rolls-Royce North America
- Science Applications International Corporation
- NII
- NVR
- Noblis
- Revature
- Verisign
- Learning Tree International
- United States Geological Survey
- National Wildlife Federation
- American College of Radiology
- CNRI
- Google Federal Services
- Gategroup's North American division
- General Dynamics
- Siteworx
- Volkswagen Group of America

Of the 20 largest venture capital firms in the Washington, D.C. area, five are in Reston. The amount of capital under management of the Reston firms, $6.9 billion, represents 53% of those top 20 regional venture capital firms.

Reston also serves as the headquarters for the North American command of the German armed forces which oversees upwards up 1,500 troops deployed in the United States at any given time.

== Arts and culture ==
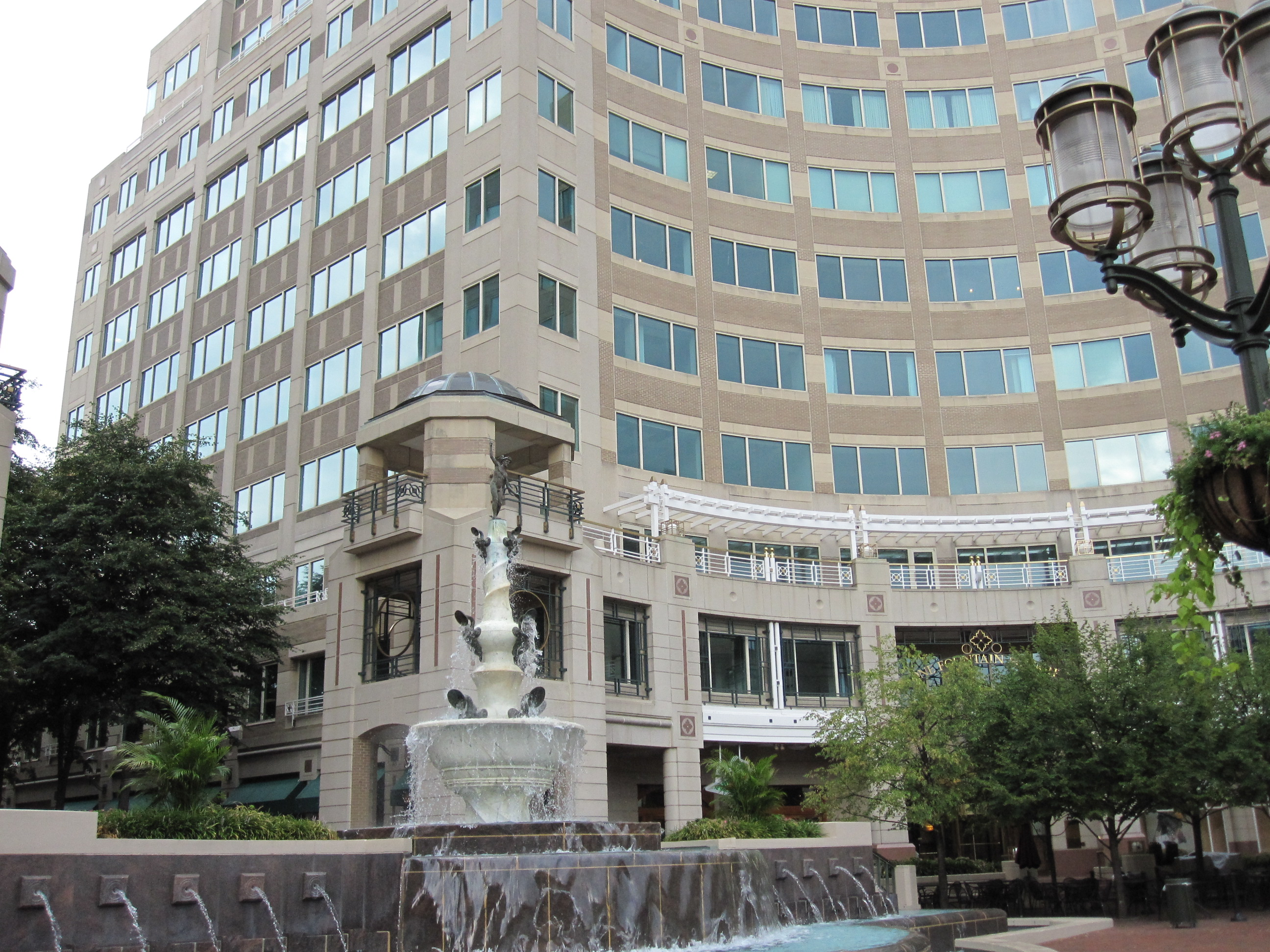
The fountain at Reston Town Center

A special tax district within Fairfax County was created to fund various recreational, educational, and cultural activities in Reston. The Reston Community Center (RCC) is a core element, with its main building in south Reston at Hunters Woods Plaza and featuring a theater, indoor heated swimming pool with jacuzzi, ballroom, meeting rooms, and classroom space. A smaller RCC branch is at Lake Anne Plaza.

Reston is home to several performing arts groups. The Reston Community Players (originally known as Reston Players) has been in operation since 1966 and performs at Reston Community Center's Center Stage in Hunters Woods Plaza. The Reston Chorale was founded in the late 1960s as a mixed-voice chorus comprising both professional and amateur singers. The Reston Community Orchestra, launched in 1988, also offers regular performances throughout the year, generally at the Reston Community Center. In the summer, free public concerts are offered at both Reston Town Center and at Lake Anne Plaza.

The Greater Reston Arts Center (GRACE), founded by local artists, is home-based at Reston Town Center and sponsors the annual Northern Virginia Fine Arts Festival. The privately owned Reston Art Gallery at Lake Anne Plaza includes both regular art exhibits and artist studio spaces.

Reston's sole museum, the Reston Historic Trust & Museum, is also located in Lake Anne Plaza. It has maps, photos, and books that provide a detailed look at Reston from the 1960s on.

The Washington West Film Festival is an autumn event in Reston center. The festival, co-founded by Mark Maxey and Brad Russell, offers a juried array of feature films, shorts and documentaries.

=== Events ===
- Northern Virginia Fine Arts Festival (Reston Town Center) (May)
- Taste of Reston Food Festival (Reston Town Center) (June)
- Reston Triathlon (September)
- Reston Multicultural Festival (Lake Anne Plaza) (late September)
- Flavors of Fall (Reston Town Center) (October)
- Reston Holiday Parade (Reston Town Center) (November)

=== Libraries ===
Fairfax County Public Library operates the Reston Regional Library. Also located in Reston is the United States Geological Survey Library, a federal research library that is open to the public with over 3 million items, ranging from books and journals to maps and photographs, as well as field record notebooks.

=== Historic sites ===
In 2017, the Lake Anne Village Center Historic District was named to the U.S. National Register of Historic Places, which serves as the official list of historic places worthy of preservation and protection.

== Parks and recreation ==
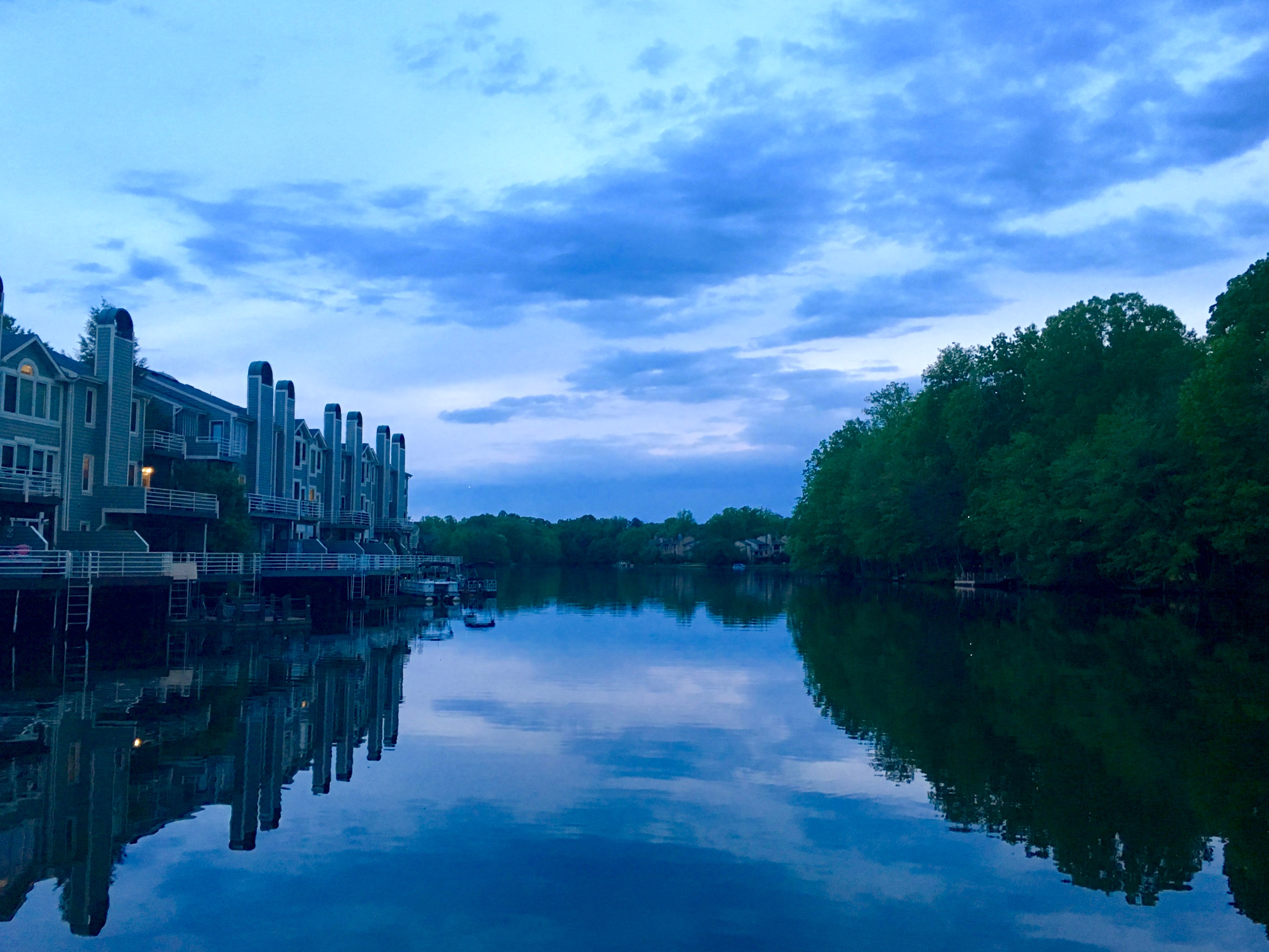
Lake Thoreau at sunset

Building on Robert Simon's emphasis on preserving green space and providing recreational opportunities, Reston features over 55 miles of walking and hiking paths for residents, with currently about 250 acres of woodlands and open space. Reston is noted for its tree canopy, which currently covers about half of Reston's total area. It is one of only eight localities in the U.S. to be a member of the worldwide Biophilic Cities Organization, which promotes the importance of protecting and promoting nature within urban areas.

The centerpiece of Reston's focus on nature is the Vernon J. Walker Nature Education Center. The Nature Center's 72 acres (290,000 m^{2}) of hardwood forest include a picnic pavilion, campfire ring, and other facilities that support its outreach programs. Its LEED gold-certified Nature House offers exhibits, an on-site naturalist, and various programs for children; it may also be rented for community or private meetings.

Two golf courses are located in Reston. The 166-acre Reston National Golf Course in south Reston is certified by Audubon International as a Cooperative Sanctuary on the Chesapeake Bay watershed. The Hidden Creek Country Club was purchased in 2017 by Wheelock Communities, a real estate development company.

The Washington and Old Dominion (W&OD) trail, which runs through Reston, is a 45-mile-long (72 km) pathway built solely for pedestrian and bicycle traffic along the former W&OD train line.

Reston contains four manmade lakes: Lake Anne, Lake Audubon, Lake Newport, and Lake Thoreau. Also within Reston's area is the 476-acre (1.9 km^{2}) Lake Fairfax Park, operated by Fairfax County and which features boat rentals, a large outdoor pool complex called "The Water Mine", overnight campground facilities, and picnic areas.

A 30-acre (120,000 m2) zoo, NOVA Wild, is located on the northeast edge of the community. It is dedicated to family-friendly animal interaction with bus rides and feeding stations. Animals include lambs, camels, zebras, antelope, bison, cheetah, emu, camels, goats, reptiles, horses, buffalo, and waterfowl.

Reston has an assortment of pools, including a year-round indoor pool at the Reston Community Center. Ice skating is available year-round at SkateQuest, a privately run indoor rink, and during the winter on an outdoor rink at Reston Town Center's Pavilion.

== Government ==
Reston is an unincorporated area in Fairfax County, and its schools, roads, and law enforcement services are provided by Fairfax County.

Parks, recreation facilities, and common grounds, as well as the extensive trail system, are overseen by the Reston Association under the provisions of the Reston Deed, the community's basic governing document. A standard assessment is levied on each apartment or lot (for townhouses and houses). The Deed also allows for reduced assessments for those who "qualify for real estate tax reduction by Fairfax County Ordinance; (ii) their units are subsidized by the federal or state government; or (iii) their units are designed and used primarily for elderly congregate care or assisted living facilities and occupied by low or moderate income residents."

Reston's individual clusters or neighborhoods have their own neighborhood associations which also levy assessments to cover grounds upkeep, snow removal, trash pick-up, and other maintenance. Each cluster has its own elected board of directors who report to the residents of that cluster.

The majority of Reston lies within Virginia's 11th congressional district, represented by James Walkinshaw (D). It is represented by Karen Keys-Gamarra (D) in the Virginia House of Delegates, and by Jennifer Boysko (D) in the State Senate.

While Reston has, from its inception, been an unincorporated area, several efforts have been made to achieve town status, primarily to gain more control over zoning and development decisions, which now are the purview of Fairfax County elected officials and staff. Robert Simon initially explored the option of incorporation as a town but was blocked by Fairfax County. Simon asserted to an interviewer that Fairfax officials informed him they would deny Reston access to Fairfax's water and sewer lines if he sought incorporation for his new community. In 1980, a group of Reston residents were successful in pushing for a referendum to incorporate Reston as a town, but the referendum failed in 1980 by a 2–1 margin. A similar initiative in 2005, which was publicly supported by Robert Simon, also failed.

== Education ==
=== Primary and secondary schools ===
As a part of Fairfax County, Reston is served by Fairfax County Public Schools and a number of private schools. Reston has one high school within its boundaries, South Lakes High School, which serves most of Reston. Adjacent to South Lakes High School is Reston's only middle school, Langston Hughes Middle School. Students who live in the far northern part of Reston attend Herndon High School.

==== Public elementary schools ====
- Buzz Aldrin Elementary School
- Neil Armstrong Elementary School
- A. Scott Crossfield Elementary School
- Dogwood Elementary School
- Forest Edge Elementary School
- Fox Mill Elementary School
- Hunters Woods Elementary School for the Arts and Sciences
- Lake Anne Elementary School
- Sunrise Valley Elementary School
- Terraset Elementary School

=== Private schools ===
- Children's House Montessori School of Reston
- Community Montessori School
- Reston Montessori School
- Academy of Christian Education (elementary)
- Edlin (elementary and middle school)
- United Christian Parish Preschool
- Lake Anne Nursery and Kindergarten (LANK)
- Ideaventions Academy for Math and Science (1st - 12th)
- Reston Children's Center (RCC)

=== Colleges and universities ===
Reston has several higher education resources, including a satellite campus of NVCC (Northern Virginia Community College), the University of Phoenix – Northern Virginia campus, and Marymount University – Reston Center.

== Media ==
Reston is served primarily by the Washington, D.C. media market. The community lies within the local newspaper distribution area for The Washington Post and The Washington Times, as well as two local publications, the Fairfax Times and the Reston Connection. All four also offer digital subscriptions. A third local paper, the "Observer," which covered Reston and nearby Herndon, closed in 2010 and transferred coverage to AOL's Patch service of local digital news sites, which launched a Reston site in August 2010. Website Reston Now provides daily local news coverage. In addition, multiple television and radio stations in the Washington metropolitan area provide coverage of local developments.

== Transportation ==
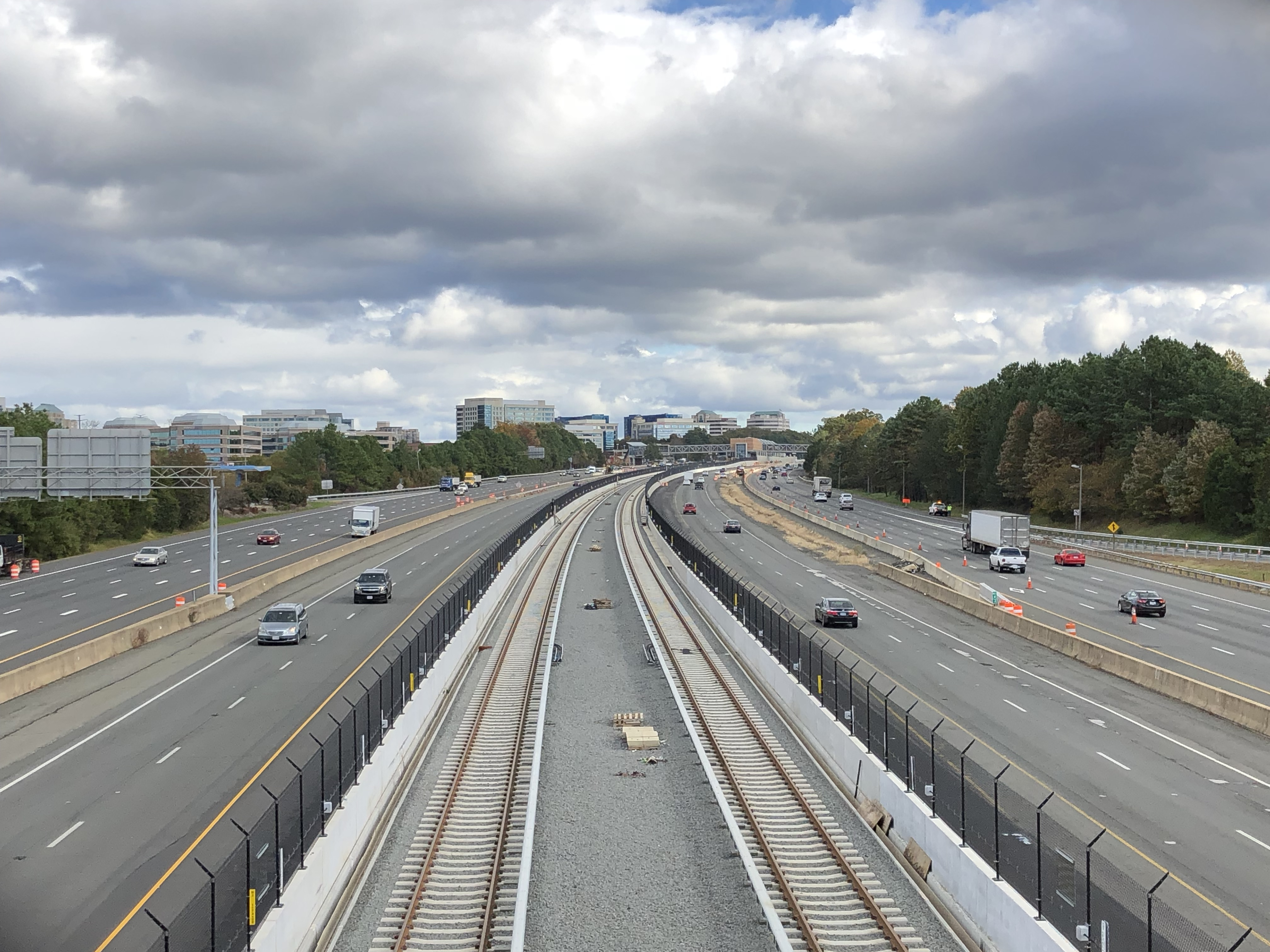
The Dulles Toll and Access Roads and the Silver Line of the Washington Metro in Reston

Reston sits astride the Dulles Toll Road, 9 miles (14 km) from Tysons and the Capital Beltway to the east, and 5 miles (8.0 km) from Washington Dulles International Airport to the west. Four roads cross the community from north to south: Fairfax County Parkway on the western side, Reston Parkway through the center of town, Wiehle Avenue through the northeastern residential section, and Hunter Mill Road on the eastern border.

The Metro's Silver Line, which runs along the Dulles Toll Road, opened its first Reston station, Wiehle-Reston East, on July 26, 2014. Two additional stations, Reston Town Center and Herndon, opened on November 15, 2022, and serve the western half of Reston as part of an expansion towards Dulles International Airport.

The Reston Internal Bus System provides five regularly circulating routes connecting Reston's village centers, using Reston Town Center as a hub. Fairfax County's Fairfax Connector and Metrobus service both link commuters in Reston to Metro stations as well as points throughout Fairfax County.

== See also ==
- Reston Station
