= Up to Snuff =

2019 documentary film about W. G. Snuffy Walden

- Film poster
- Directed by: Mark Maxey
- Produced by: Mark Maxey; Gino Scofidio
- Starring: Aaron Sorkin; Martin Sheen; Tom Arnold; Timothy Busfield; Joshua Malina; Eric Burdon; Lawrence O'Donnell; W. G. Snuffy Walden
- Cinematography: Shawn Grice
- Edited by: Gino Scofidio
- Music by: W. G. Snuffy Walden
- Release date: March 14, 2018 (Pasadena Film Festival)
- Running time: 80 minutes
- Country: United States
- Language: English

Up to Snuff is a 2018 documentary film about musician and composer W. G. Snuffy Walden, written, directed and produced by Mark Maxey, produced and edited by Gino Scofidio.

Following his years as a touring and session musician and an Emmy nomination for the "Theme from Thirtysomething", Walden scored numerous television series, including Roseanne, Ellen, My So-Called Life, Felicity, Early Edition, Sports Night, The West Wing, George Lopez, I'll Fly Away, The Stand, Huff, Once and Again, Friday Night Lights and Studio 60 on the Sunset Strip.

== Synopsis ==
Up to Snuff follows Walden's experience in the music industry in the 1960s and 1970s, immersed in the "sex, drugs and rock and roll" lifestyle of touring musicians. Walden became sober and transitioned into a composer, scoring music for television programs. The film looks at that his transition, with interviews with Walden's colleagues and collaborators, including Aaron Sorkin, Martin Sheen, Tom Arnold, Timothy Busfield, Lawrence O'Donnell, Joshua Malina, Fred Savage, Ed Asner, and musicians Eric Burdon, Steve Lukather, Tris Imboden, and Mike Post.

== Accolades ==
| Award | Category | Result | Ref. |
|---|---|---|---|
| Newport Beach Film Festival | Audience Favorite - Music | Won | |
| Phoenix Film Festival | Audience Favorite | Won | |
| Red Rock Film Festival | Audience Favorite | Won | |
| Orlando Film Festival | Focus on Art Award | Won | |
| Washington West Film Festival | Best Directorial Debut | Won | |
