= IKANOW =

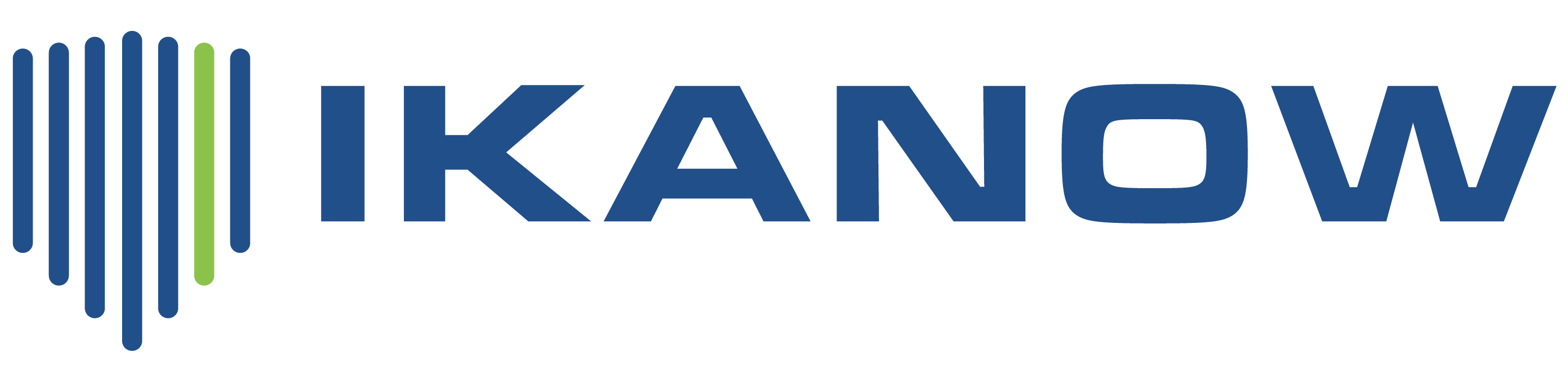
- Company type: Private
- Industry: Information Technology
- Founded: 2010
- Headquarters: Reston, Virginia, United States
- Key people: Dave Camarata, CEO, co-founder, Chris Morgan, President, co-founder
- Services: Cyber security analytics
- Website: www.ikanow.com

IKANOW is an American data analytics company based in Reston, Virginia that harvests and analyzes structured and unstructured data. Founded in 2010, while doing intelligence work in Afghanistan and Iraq, IKANOW created an open analytics platform using open source technologies. IKANOW also performs threat analytics to help organizations assess their current risk levels, provide security, and increase situational awareness. According to SC Magazine, a magazine for IT security professionals, leveraging analytics platforms such as IKANOW's creates intelligence that security leaders can use in their decision platform. IKANOW provides analytical services regarding cyber security to Fortune 500 companies, service providers, and government agencies.

== Overview ==
IKANOW was founded in 2010 by Chris Morgan and Dave Camarata, who previously worked with the United States Department of Defense and Intelligence Community for over a decade. IKANOW became an open source big data platform provider that assists businesses with understanding big data. The company developed an open-source and Big Data analytics platform, named IKANOW Community Edition, formerly Infinite.e, to analyze and build data-driven applications. IKANOW's white paper Beyond The Kill Chain: How Information Security Platforms Must Evolve For Today's CISO was featured in Cyber Defense Magazine. IKANOW Community Edition has been used to perform sentiment analysis testing on the largest publicly available set of emails from the Federal Energy Regulatory Commission investigation of the Enron financial scandal.
