= Lawrence O'Donnell =

American TV host, pundit (born 1951)

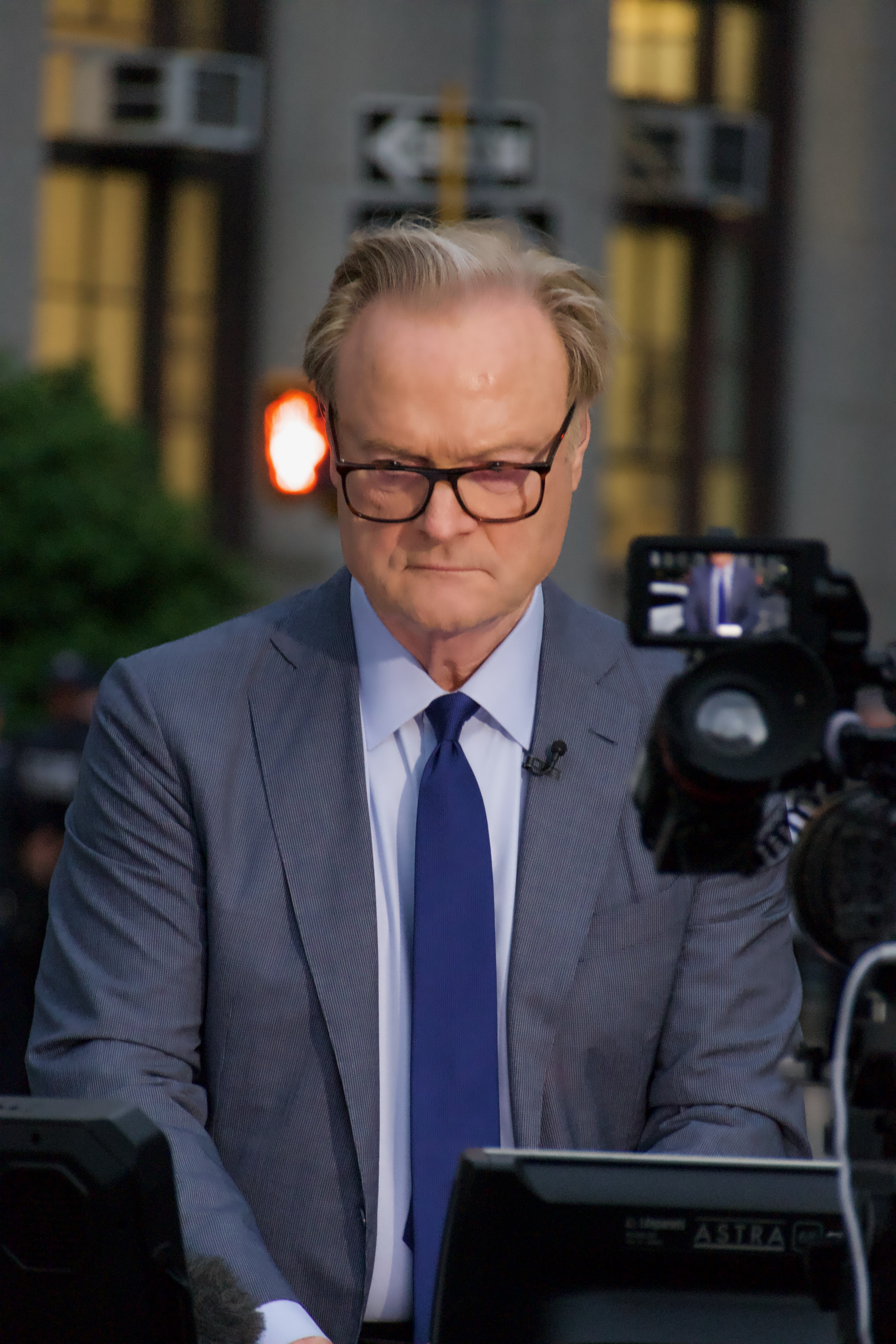
- O'Donnell covering the criminal trial of Donald Trump in New York in 2024
- Born: Lawrence Francis O'Donnell Jr. November 7, 1951 (age 74); Boston, Massachusetts, U.S.
- Education: Harvard University (BA)
- Occupations: Political analyst; TV host; actor; senate staffer
- Notable credits: The Last Word with Lawrence O'Donnell; The McLaughlin Group; Morning Joe; The West Wing
- Spouse: Kathryn Harrold (m. 1994; div. 2013)

Lawrence Francis O'Donnell Jr. (born November 7, 1951) is an American television anchor, actor, author, screenwriter, political commentator, and host of The Last Word with Lawrence O'Donnell, an MS NOW opinion and news program that airs on weeknights.

He was a writer and producer for the NBC series The West Wing (playing the role of President Bartlet's father in flashbacks) as well as creator and executive producer of the NBC series Mister Sterling. He also appeared as recurring character Lee Hatcher in the HBO series Big Love.

O'Donnell began his political career in 1989, as an aide to U.S. Senator Daniel Patrick Moynihan, and was staff director for the Senate Finance Committee. He describes himself as a "practical European socialist".

== Early life ==
O'Donnell was born in Boston on November 7, 1951, the son of Frances Marie (née Buckley), an office manager, and Lawrence Francis O'Donnell Sr., an attorney and member of the Supreme Court Bar. He is of Irish descent and was raised Catholic. He attended St. Sebastian's School (class of 1970), where he was captain of the baseball team and wide receiver on their undefeated football team. O'Donnell majored in economics at Harvard College, graduating in 1976. While at Harvard, he wrote for the Harvard Lampoon.

== Career ==
=== Author ===
From 1977 to 1988, O'Donnell was a writer. In 1983, he published the book Deadly Force, about a case of wrongful death and police brutality in which O'Donnell's father was the plaintiff's lawyer. In 1986, the book was made into the film A Case of Deadly Force; Richard Crenna played O'Donnell's father, and Tate Donovan played O'Donnell; O'Donnell was associate producer. In 2017, O'Donnell published the book Playing with Fire: The 1968 Election and the Transformation of American Politics.

=== U.S. Congress ===
From 1989 to 1995, O'Donnell was a legislative aide to Senator Daniel Patrick Moynihan. He served as senior adviser to Moynihan from 1989 to 1991, then as staff director of two senate committees that Moynihan was chairing: Environment and Public Works from 1992 to 1993, and Finance from 1993 to 1995.

=== Television ===
==== Writing and production ====
From 1999 to 2006, O'Donnell was associated with the television drama The West Wing, writing 16 episodes and serving as executive story editor for 12 episodes (1999–2000), as co-producer for five episodes (2000), as producer for 17 episodes (2000–2001), as consulting producer for 44 episodes (2003–2005), and as executive producer for 22 episodes (2005–2006). He won the 2001 Primetime Emmy Award for Outstanding Drama Series for The West Wing and was nominated for the 2006 Emmy in the same category.

In 2002, O'Donnell was supervising producer and writer for the television drama First Monday; and in 2003 he was creator, executive producer, and writer for the television drama Mister Sterling.

==== Contributor and host ====
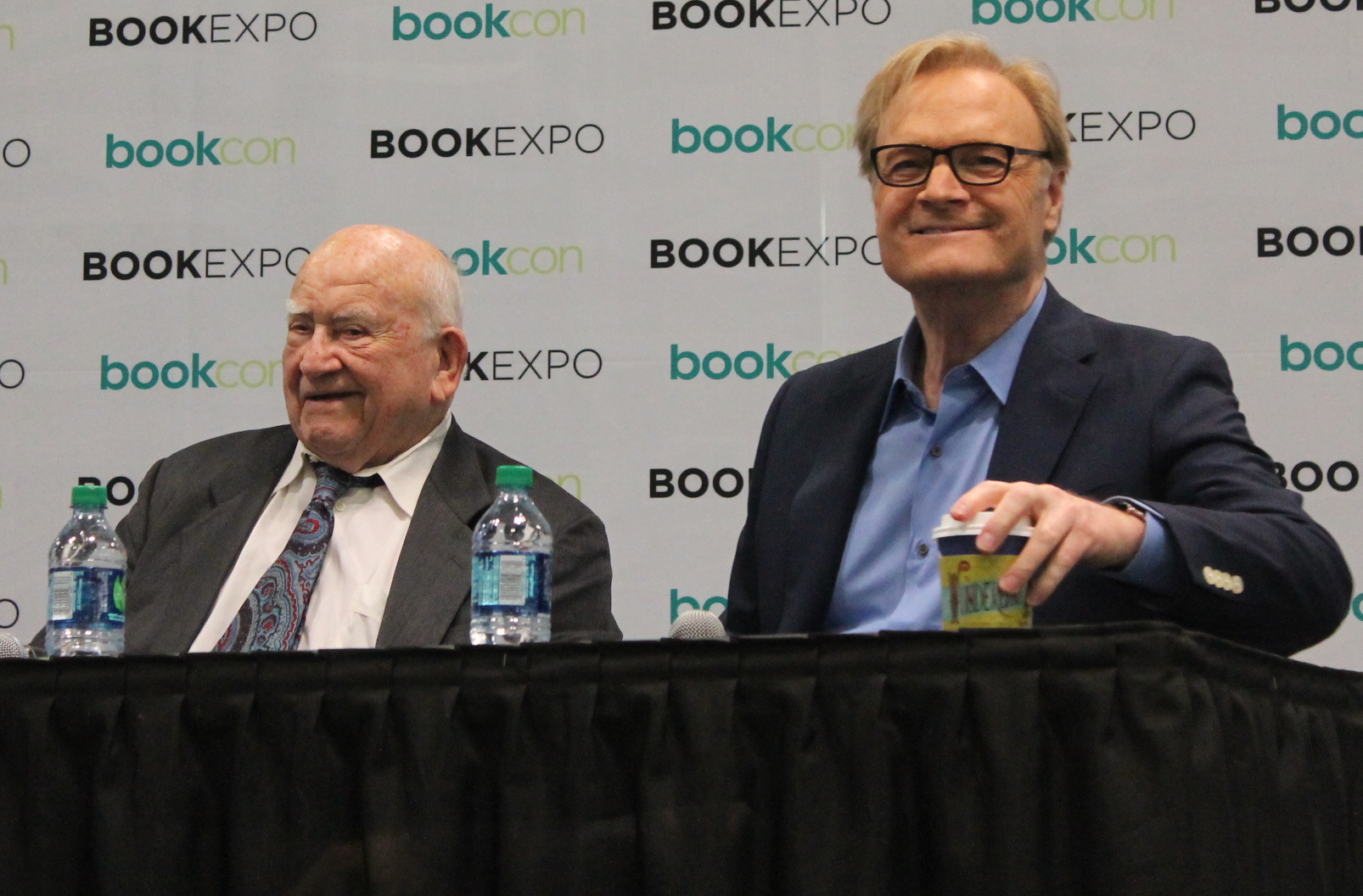
O'Donnell (right) and Ed Asner in 2017

In 2009, O'Donnell became a regular contributor on Morning Joe with Joe Scarborough. His aggressive debate style on that program and others led to several on-air confrontations, including an interview with conservative Marc Thiessen on Morning Joe that became so heated that Scarborough took O'Donnell off the air. Also in 2009 and 2010, O'Donnell began appearing frequently as a substitute host of Countdown with Keith Olbermann, particularly when Olbermann's father was ill in the hospital.

On September 27, 2010, O'Donnell began hosting a 10 p.m. show on MSNBC, called The Last Word with Lawrence O'Donnell. On January 21, 2011, it was announced that O'Donnell would take over the 8 p.m. slot from Keith Olbermann after Olbermann announced the abrupt termination of his show, Countdown with Keith Olbermann. Beginning October 24, 2011, The Last Word with Lawrence O'Donnell switched time slots with The Ed Show, with Ed Schultz taking over the 8 p.m. Eastern slot, and O'Donnell returning to the 10 p.m. Eastern slot.

On September 20, 2017, an eight-minute video clip was leaked; it showed O'Donnell angrily cursing and swearing about background noise between segments of a live broadcast that had aired on August 29, 2017. O'Donnell apologized on Twitter, and the leaker was subsequently fired.

O'Donnell gave an impassioned opening on his show on July 7 and 8, 2026, about the controversies surrounding the Maine Democratic U.S. Senate nominee, Graham Platner. He said he never interviewed the candidate, noting he was suspicious of his background. He went on to say that, despite his image as a "working man," he came from a wealthy family and that his image was largely crafted by outsiders. The dialogue stood out because the network had been one of those that helped elevate the Platner candidacy. “We've been very careful about what campaigns we have focused on here,” O’Donnell said.

==== Acting ====
O'Donnell played Lee Hatcher, the Henrickson family attorney, in the HBO series Big Love, about a polygamous family in Utah. In addition to being a producer on The West Wing, O'Donnell also played President Josiah Bartlet's father in a flashback sequence of the episode "Two Cathedrals". O'Donnell portrayed Judge Lawrence Barr in two episodes of Monk and played himself on an episode of Showtime's Homeland.

== Controversies ==
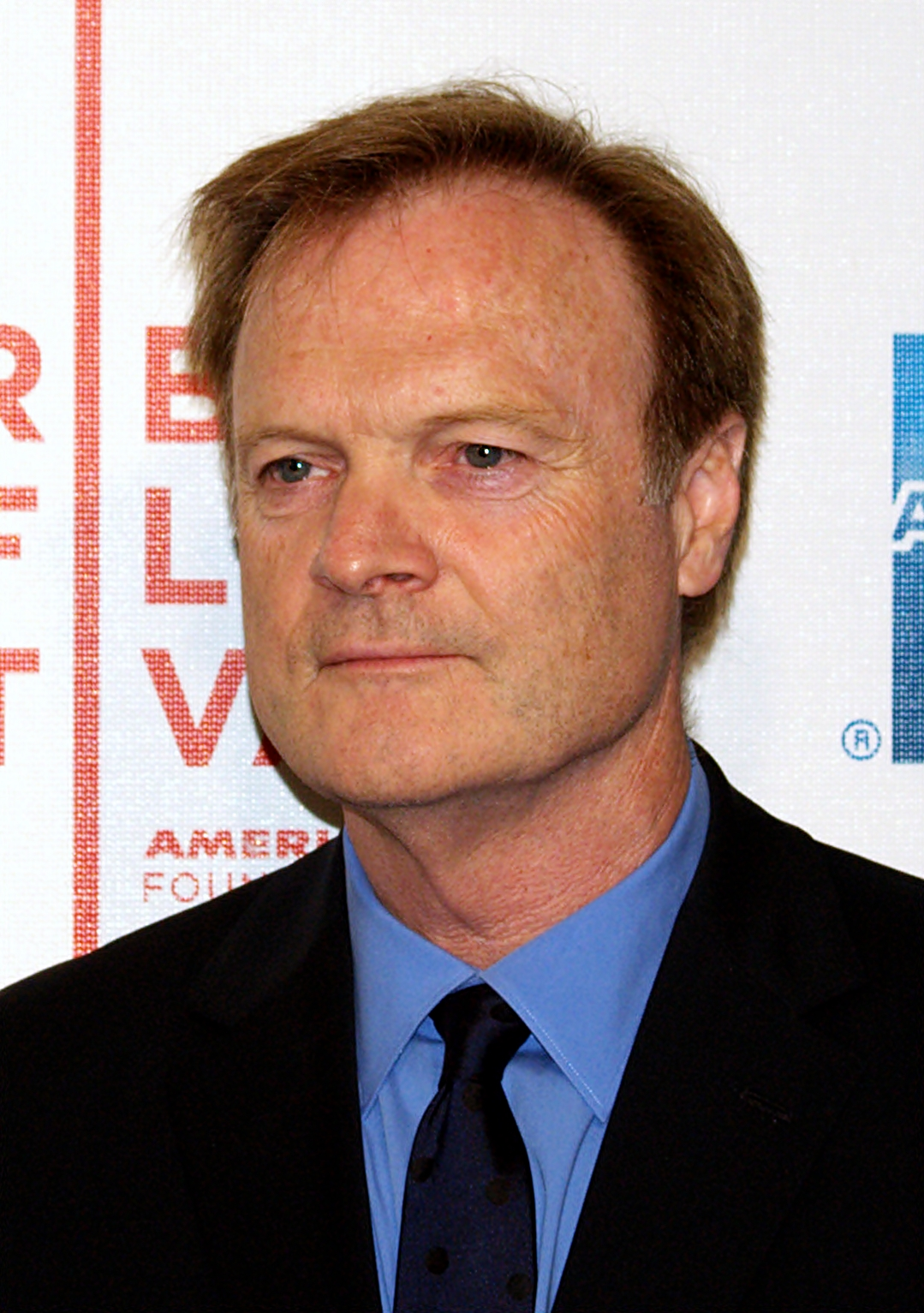
O'Donnell at the 2009 premiere of PoliWood

=== Comments about religion and slavery ===
In 2007, O'Donnell criticized Mitt Romney's speech on religion, stating: "Romney comes from a religion that was founded by a criminal who was anti-American, pro-slavery, and a rapist."

In the April 3, 2012, broadcast of The Last Word, O'Donnell made comments regarding the Church of Jesus Christ of Latter-day Saints (LDS Church), saying it was an "invented religion," which was "created by a guy in upstate New York in 1830 when he got caught having sex with the maid and explained to his wife that God told him to do it." During the April 11, 2012, broadcast of The Last Word, O'Donnell apologized for the April 3 comments, stating that they had offended many, including some of the show's most supportive fans.

In late 2010, O’Donnell showed a taped October 2010 interview with RNC Chairman Michael Steele. In O'Donnell's introduction to the taped interview, he said, "Michael Steele is dancing as fast as he can, trying to charm independent voters and Tea Partiers while never losing sight of his real master and paycheck provider, the Republican National Committee." After these remarks drew criticism from Steele and talk-radio host Larry Elder, who both characterized them as racially insensitive, O'Donnell apologized for them.

=== Controversial interviews and stories ===
O'Donnell also drew criticism for an October 2010 interview with Congressman Ron Paul, when Paul accused him of breaking an agreement not to ask him about other political candidates. O'Donnell said he had not been part of any agreement, but an MSNBC spokeswoman stated, "We told Representative Paul's office that the focus would be on the tea party movement, not on specific candidates."

During an October 2011 interview, O'Donnell accused Republican primary candidate Herman Cain of not participating in protests during the 1960s civil rights movement and of avoiding the draft during the Vietnam War. The Atlantic's Conor Friedersdorf called O’Donnell's questions during the interview "offensive", adding, "In this interview, O'Donnell goes to absurd lengths to use patriotism and jingoism as cudgels to attack his conservative guest, almost as if he is doing a Stephen Colbert-style parody of the tactics he imagines a right-wing blowhard might employ. Does he realize he's becoming what he claims to abhor?". O'Donnell's interview with Cain was later defended by Reverend Al Sharpton.

On August 27, 2019, O'Donnell reported that Deutsche Bank documents showed Russian oligarchs had cosigned loan applications for Trump. O'Donnell based this report on a single source that he did not identify, although he used the qualifier "if true," and acknowledged that it had not been verified by NBC News. The next day, O'Donnell retracted the report, referring to his reporting of it as an "error in judgment."

== Political views ==
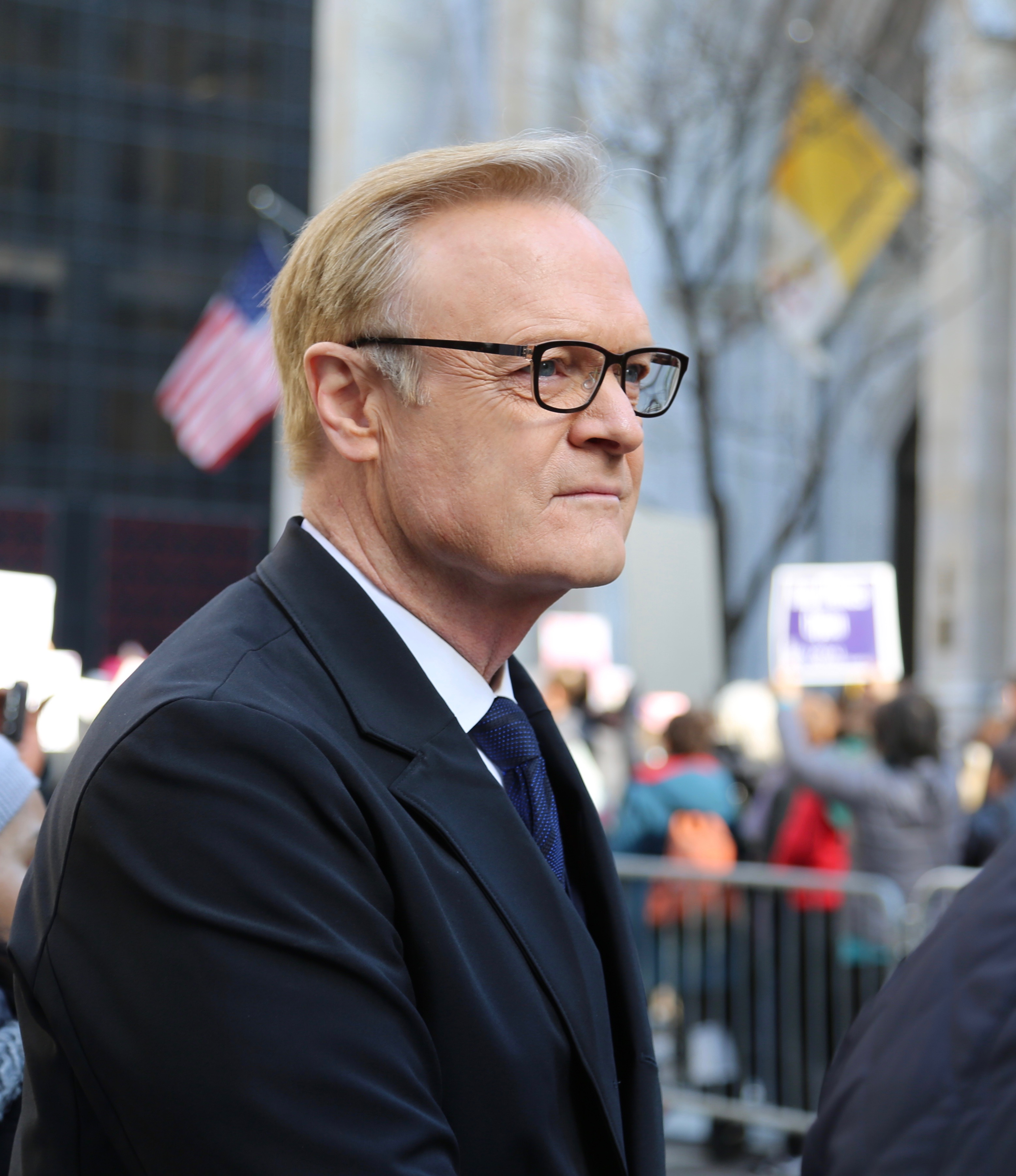
O'Donnell at the Women's March along Fifth Avenue on January 21, 2017

In a 2005 interview, O'Donnell called himself a "practical European socialist." O'Donnell also declared himself a "socialist" on the November 6, 2010, Morning Joe show, stating: "I am not a progressive. I am not a liberal who is so afraid of the word that I had to change my name to 'progressive'. Liberals amuse me. I am a socialist. I live to the extreme left, the extreme left of you mere liberals." On the August 1, 2011, episode of The Last Word, O'Donnell further explained: "I have been calling myself a socialist ever since I first read the definition of socialism in the first economics class I took in college".

== Philanthropy ==
In 2010, O'Donnell made a trip to Malawi with the intent of providing schoolroom desks for female children who had never seen desks. MSNBC and UNICEF partnered to create the K.I.N.D. Fund—Kids in Need of Desks—with a mission to deliver desks to Malawian schools. By 2023, the K.I.N.D. Fund had raised $40 million for desks and scholarships to support the education of Malawian schoolgirls. As of December 2025, the K.I.N.D. Fund has supplied 405,000 desks for 1.6 million students and scholarships for 38,000 girls.

== Personal life ==
On February 14, 1994, Lawrence O'Donnell married Kathryn Harrold. The couple has one child, Elizabeth Buckley Harrold O'Donnell. O'Donnell and Harrold divorced in 2013.

In April 2014, he and his brother Michael were injured in a traffic accident while vacationing in the British Virgin Islands. O'Donnell returned to his MSNBC show The Last Word in June after two months of recuperation.

He was awarded the honorary degree of Doctor of Humane Letters (DHL) by Suffolk University in 2001.

== Filmography ==
=== Film ===
Year	Title	Role	Notes
2006	An Unreasonable Man	Himself	Documentary
2008	Swing Vote	Himself	
2012	The Campaign	Himself	
2012	Game Change	Himself	Uncredited
2013	Olympus Has Fallen	Himself	
2016	London Has Fallen	Himself	Uncredited
2018	Up to Snuff	Himself	Documentary

=== Television ===
Year	Title	Role	Notes
2001	The West Wing	Dr. Bartlet	Episode: "Two Cathedrals"; also wrote 16 episodes
2003	The Practice	Judge Franklin Brown	Episode: "Goodbye"
2003	The Lyon's Den	Judge Calloway	Episode: "Privileged"
2005	Mrs. Harris	Judge Leggett	Television film
2006, 2008	Monk	Judge Lawrence Barr	2 episodes
2006–2011	Big Love	Lee Hatcher	11 episodes
2011	Homeland	Himself	Episode: "Clean Skin"
2012	Damages	The Last Word Host	Episode: "I Love You, Mommy"
2012	Chasing the Hill	Gov. Jack Ross	Episode: "The Enchanted Life of Samantha Clemons"
2013	Franklin & Bash	Judge Paul W. Redford	Episode: "Gone in a Flash"
2013	True Blood	Himself	Episode: "Radioactive"
2013	The Neighbors	Himself	Episode: "Close Encounters of the Bird Kind"
2015	The Jim Gaffigan Show	Himself	Episode: "The Bible Story"
2017	Curb Your Enthusiasm	Himself	Episode: "Foisted!"
2018	I Love You, America with Sarah Silverman	Himself	Episode: "Steve Schmidt"
2018	The Circus: Inside the Greatest Political Show on Earth	Himself	Episode: "War and Peace"
2018	House of Cards	Himself	Episode: "Chapter 70"
2018	Murphy Brown	Himself	Episode: "Happy New Year"
2019	The Simpsons	Himself	Episode: "Mad About the Toy"
2023	The Other Two	Himself	Episode: "Brooke & Cary & Curtis & Lance"

== See also ==
- New Yorkers in journalism
