= Revature =

Technology talent development company

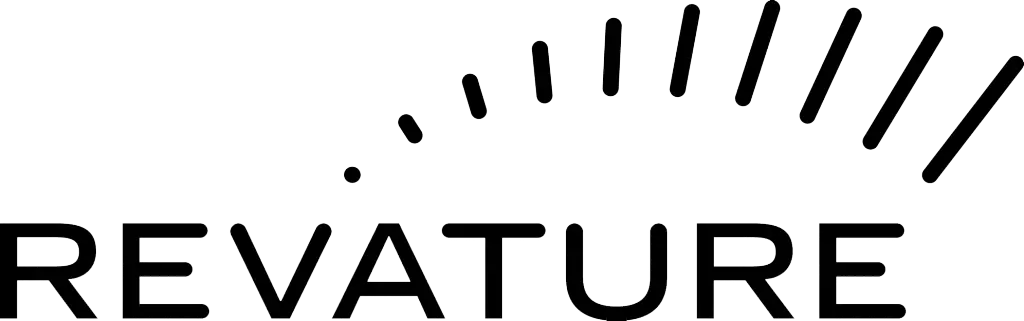
- Company type: Private
- Industry: IT services
- Founded: November 17, 2003; 21 years ago
- Founders: Srikanth Ramachandran; Ashwin Bharath
- Headquarters: Reston, Virginia, United States
- Number of locations: 7 (including partner campuses)
- Key people: Ashwin Bharath (Executive Chairman); Tan Moorthy (CEO)
- Website: www.revature.com

Revature is a technology talent development company headquartered in Reston, Virginia, USA. Its business model involves hiring recent U.S. college graduates, training them in high demand software skills, and deploying them to work on information technology projects for Revature’s corporate and government clients.

Unlike coding “boot camps” and most other forms of information technology training, Revature does not charge its students tuition, instead paying them a salary during their training and project work.

== History ==
Revature was founded in 2003 (under the name Multivision) as a traditional staffing agency, but experienced difficulty finding prospective employees with the technology skills employers sought. Around 2014, it became a talent development company with the aim of supplying those unmet needs.

In March 2016, Revature raised $20 million in VC funding in a series A round led by University Ventures, Eden Capital and USA Funds.

In February 2019, Investcorp acquired a controlling stake in Revature for an undisclosed sum.

In its current form, the company’s clients have included Accenture plc, Capital One, the Financial Industry Regulatory Authority (FINRA), and REI Systems, Inc. According to the company, it has trained more than 7,000 software engineers.

In April 2020, during the COVID-19 pandemic, Revature announced that it would “donate approximately 2,000 hours of instructor-led, virtual coding training to essential workers, their families and others who have been impacted by COVID-19.”

=== Other initiatives ===
In September 2020, Revature announced the launch of a suite of new workforce reskilling services designed for companies seeking to retrain their existing employees.

Since 2020, the company has partnered with the Thurgood Marshall College Fund to offer scholarships to undergraduates at historically black colleges and universities that are members of the Fund.

== Controversies ==
Revature has been criticized for the way it treats graduates who choose to leave the program within two years of their initial placement. In January 2021, the Medium tech publication OneZero reported that, according to contract documents, “associates [who] choose to quit within two years after the training... could be on the hook for a $36,500 quitting fee.”

The company defended the practice on the basis that students receive value from the training and placement. A spokesperson for the University of Maryland Global Campus (a Revature partner) agreed, comparing the “quitting fee” to the practices of the United States Reserve Officers’ Training Corps, which requires scholarship recipients to serve in the armed forces for a given period after graduation; otherwise, they must pay back the cost of college.

As of 2025, Revature's contract no longer stipulates a quitting fee.
