= Washington West Film Festival =

Film festival in Virginia

The Washington West Film Festival is an annual film festival held in Reston, Virginia every autumn since 2011. It is noted for being organized as a fundraising project for charity.

== Festival ==
The Festival is the project of Brad Russell, Pastor of the Dulles Community Church. Pastor Russell is known for showing short scenes from popular films to illustrate the theme of his sermons. Mark Maxey is Chairman of the Festival's Board of Directors.

Beginning with a single venue, by its fifth year the week-long festival was screening dozens of new films in multiple venues.

The festival includes an oral storytelling event - with whiskey - to which only the filmmakers are admitted.

== Charity ==
The festival, which donates 100% percent of box office receipts to charity, selects a different charity to fund each year. In 2013, the festival funded rebuilding efforts in Breezy Point, Queens, a New York City neighbohoood ravaged by Hurricane Sandy. In 2011 it funded the construction of a theatre and community center in Haiti.
