= Mark Maxey =

American film director

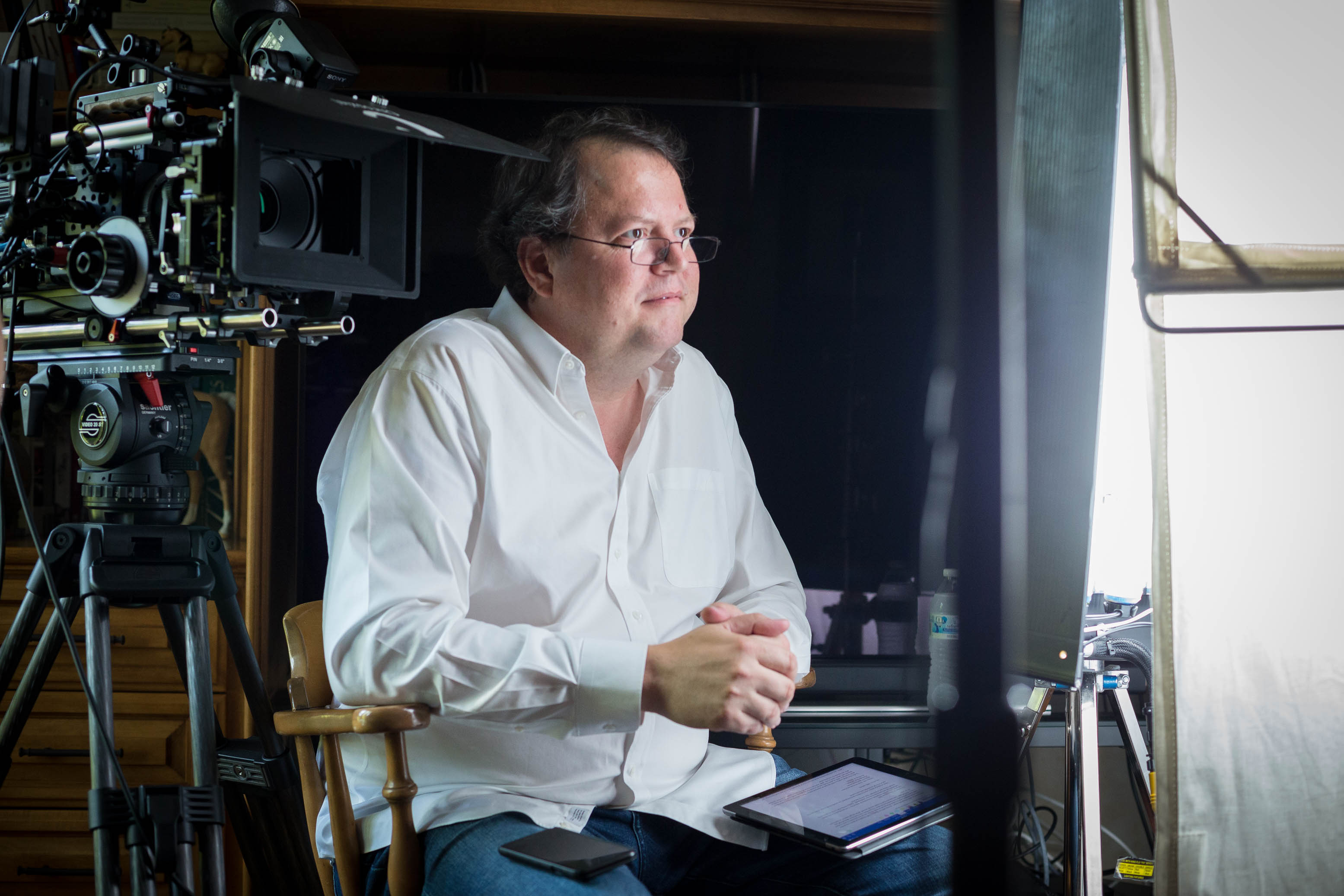
- Maxey filming on location, July 2017
- Born: John Mark Maxey; May 13, 1969; Long Beach, California, U.S.
- Occupations: Producer, writer, director, filmmaker
- Years active: 2000–present
- Spouse: Rebecca Ewing (m. 1998)
- Children: 2
- Website: rollingpictures.com

Mark Maxey (born May 13, 1969) is an American producer, writer and director of film and television best known for the documentary film Up to Snuff (2019), about musician/composer W. G. Snuffy Walden.

== Early life ==
Mark Maxey was born on May 13, 1969, in Long Beach, California, the son of concert marimbist Linda Maxey and clarinetist Lawrence Maxey. The family moved to Lawrence, Kansas where Maxey's father taught at the University of Kansas School of Music for the next 37 years.

In Lawrence, the Maxey family lived across the street from the Centron film studio, where, as a boy, Maxey first entered the industry in small roles and as an extra. He was involved in the Lawrence Community Theater while in high school, and worked for the Theater after graduating from Lawrence High School in 1987.

In 1990 he moved to Washington, D.C. to begin working in television production. He became a vice president at Yorktel.

== Professional ==
Maxey is a television and film producer who wrote, directed and produced the documentary film Up to Snuff (2019) about musician and composer W.G. Snuffy Walden. The film is a story of redemption and chronicles Walden's excesses as a touring rock and roll musician in the 1970's and '80's, and his decision to choose sobriety and reinvent himself as a television and film composer.

In 2014, Maxey won an Emmy Award for The Honors: A Salute to American Heroes which he produced. Maxey's other productions include television specials such as American Valor, Salute to Veterans, The Wounded Warrior Experience, and the National Memorial Day Parade, each of which were broadcast nationally on cable television. Maxey also created the PBS primetime special On Stage at the Kennedy Center: A Holiday Concert for the Troops with the late Marvin Hamlisch.

In 2011, Maxey co-founded with Brad Russell the Washington West Film Festival Maxey serves as chairman of the board and Russell as president.

Maxey produced Mayim Bialik's feature directorial debut As They Made Us which was written, directed and produced by Bialik. The film stars Dianna Agron, Simon Helberg, Candice Bergen, Dustin Hoffman, Julian Gant, Charlie Weber and Justin Chu Cary. The plot follows Abigail (Agron) and the last moments that she and her family spend with her dying father (Hoffman). It was released in theaters and on video on demand by Quiver Distribution on April 8, 2022. It received positive reviews from critics.

In 2022, Maxey produced the feature film Space Oddity directed by Kyra Sedgwick and written by Rebecca Banner. The film stars Kyle Allen, Alexandra Shipp, Madeline Brewer, Carrie Preston, Simon Helberg and Kevin Bacon. The film had its premiere at the 2022 Tribeca Film Festival on June 12, 2022. It was released by Samuel Goldwyn Films on March 31, 2023.

Maxey produced the 2025 film Words of War about the late Russian journalist Anna Politkovskaya. Directed by James Strong, it stars Maxine Peake as Politkovskaya, Jason Isaacs as her husband Sascha, and Ciarán Hinds as her Nobel Peace Prize-winning editor at the Novaya Gazeta, Dmitry Muratov. Sean Penn is the executive producer of the film. Variety reported that Words of War will be released in U.S. theaters starting on May 2, 2025.

== Personal ==
On September 6, 1998, Maxey married Rebecca Ewing. Together they have two sons and reside the Washington D.C. metro area.
