= The Vow (TV series) =

2020 American true crime documentary series

- Genre: Documentary
- Music by: Mac Quayle; Michael Tuller; Reinhold Heil
- Opening theme: "Dream State (Brighter Night)" by Bonnie Piesse & Son Lux
- Country of origin: United States
- Original language: English
- No. of seasons: 2
- No. of episodes: 15

Production
- Executive producers: Jehane Noujaim; Karim Amer; Geralyn White Dreyfous; Mike Lerner; Nina Fialkow; Lyn Davis Lear; Regina K. Scully; Nancy Abraham; Lisa Heller
- Producers: Victor Buhler; Rosadel Varela; Claire Reade; Aleks Gezentsvey; Sara Rodriguez; Christina D. King; Mona Eldaief; Dan Hacker; Richard Hankin; John Miller-Monzon
- Cinematography: Sam Price-Waldman; Bowie Alexander; Ian Moubayed; Omar Mullick
- Editors: Aleks Gezentsvey; Christopher Passig; Alicia Ellis; Rebecca Adorno; Karim López; Nyneve Minnear; Erin Casper; David Osit; Arielle Sherman; Daniel Koehler; Kevin Chapados; Kim Hall; David Zieff; Hana Wuerker; Rameen Aminzadeh; Austin Reedy; Rob Leshin; Brittany Kaplan
- Running time: 56–58 minutes
- Production companies: HBO Documentary Films; The Othrs

Original release
- Network: HBO
- Release: August 23, 2020 – November 21, 2022

The Vow is an American true crime documentary series directed by Jehane Noujaim and Karim Amer that revolves around the cult NXIVM and its leader Keith Raniere. The NXIVM documentary series premiered on August 23, 2020, on HBO. In October 2020, the series was renewed for a second season, which premiered on October 17, 2022.

== Premise ==
The Vow follows members who joined the self-improvement group NXIVM – whose leader, Keith Raniere, was convicted of sex trafficking and racketeering conspiracy, among other crimes – and reveals the emotional toll of unfolding events, as well as the role actress Allison Mack played in recruiting new members. In the first season, former NXIVM members Sarah Edmondson, Mark Vicente, Bonnie Piesse, Anthony "Nippy" Ames, Barbara Bouchey, Susan Dones and Toni Natalie appear prominently, alongside Frank Parlato, who helped start initial reporting on the criminal activity of NXIVM, and New York Times reporter Barry Meier. Catherine Oxenberg appears in the series as she attempts to rescue her daughter India Oxenberg, a story at the center of another docuseries, Seduced: Inside the NXIVM Cult.

The second season of the series focuses on Raniere's trial and takes a continued look inside his inner circle and at ongoing supporters through interviews with co-founder Nancy Salzman and her daughter, Michelle Salzman, former NXIVM members Karen Unterreiner, Isabella Constantino and Verónica Jaspeado, New York Post journalist Emily Saul, lead prosecutor Moira Kim Penza, defense attorney Marc Agnifilo and supporters Nicki Clyne, Marc Elliot, Michele Hatchette, and Eduardo Aunsolo.

== Production ==
=== Development ===
In 2007, Jehane Noujaim took a NXIVM course after being recruited by Sara Bronfman. Noujaim previously wanted to make a documentary about NXIVM, after hearing about people's lives being changed within days, but was unable to get the access she needed to make the film. Noujaim returned to finish her courses in 2017, where she was told about abuses within the organization and began documenting alongside Karim Amer. Editors on the project suggested Noujaim participate as a subject in the series; however, since she only took two weeks of classes compared to other participants in the series, she felt it would not be right. Noujaim and Amer planned to split the story into two parts, with the first part focusing on those who left the cult and the second focusing on legal aspects. Noujaim wanted to interview all involved in NXIVM including its founder Nancy Salzman, who took a year to decide to participate in the series, to show a 360-view of an "eco-system of manipulation". Cult expert Janja Lalich served as a consultant on the series. In April 2019, it was announced the series had been greenlit by HBO, with HBO Documentary Films producing.

=== Filming ===
Production on the series began in 2017, initially focusing on Sarah Edmondson, Mark Vicente, Bonnie Piesse, Anthony Ames, and Catherine Oxenberg as a way to document their escape from NXIVM as they were fearful of being sued by Clare Bronfman, and wanted to protect themselves by having it taped. The series was shot using Cinéma vérité, with all involved in the project unsure what would happen to NXIVM and Raniere. Oxenberg filmed with Noujaim and Amer for a year-and-a-half before reuniting with her daughter, India Oxenberg, whom she attempts to rescue throughout the first season. Oxenberg decided to split from the production in fear her daughter would not reunite with her with cameras around. India Oxenberg decided not to participate in the series as she was not ready at the time of production to share her story to any outlet; she later did in Seduced, which focuses on her story as told by her and her mother.

In September 2020, in an interview with Variety Noujaim stated "We reached out to everybody involved — many people, on all sides of the story — and we are continuing to film." On October 16, 2020, HBO renewed the series for a second season.

The series additionally features archive footage and recordings of Keith Raniere, Nancy Salzman, Lauren Salzman, Clare Bronfman, Sara Bronfman, Emiliano Salinas, Nicki Clyne, and Marc Elliot, among others, which were shot by Vicente as part of NXIVM's plan to document Raniere and how "wise" he was for "future generations". Noujaim and Amer attempted to have a sit-down interview with Raniere, but were not able to meet his conditions, apart from interviewing his supporters, as the two do not allow funders or subjects to control their projects creatively. For the second season, Noujaim directed the season without Karim Amer, who departed to focus on other projects but remained an executive producer.

=== Post-production ===
During post-production, Dart Center for Journalism and Trauma was brought on to help editors with the dark subject matter and material. Episodes were also sent to RAINN to be reviewed for sensitivity. For the first season, Noujaim and Amer wanted the series to unfold in a "indoctrination" way stating: "This is why it is not until the penultimate episode, “The Wound,” that we share the most gut-wrenching concepts and where the inner circle were being led. It was crucial for the audience to experience the slow boil, the line-bending and boundary-pushing that happens over a number of years (or in the case of the series a number of episodes) in order for this important process of internal manipulation to be understood authentically." With the second season set to be its last, Noujaim has expressed interest in making a third season or a special focusing on the organization in Mexico, as a majority of members were from Mexico.

== Episodes ==
=== Season 1 (2020) ===
No. overall	No. in season	Title	Directed by	Original release date	U.S. viewers (millions)
1	1	"The Science of Joy"	Jehane Noujaim; Karim Amer	August 23, 2020	0.342
NXIVM members Mark Vicente, Sarah Edmondson, and Bonnie Piesse recounted joining the self-improvement organization NXIVM and meeting Nancy Salzman, Allison Mack, and Keith Raniere. Mark Vicente and Sarah Edmondson describe the inner workings of NXIVM, including its curriculums and various NXIVM groups.
2	2	"Viscera"	Jehane Noujaim; Karim Amer	August 30, 2020	0.338
Bonnie Piesse leaves NXIVM, while her husband, Mark Vicente, remains loyal to NXIVM. However, after learning about a women's secret subgroup, called DOS, Mark Vicente begins doubting NXIVM and Keith Raniere.
3	3	"At Cause"	Jehane Noujaim; Karim Amer	September 6, 2020 (Note: "At Cause" was released on September 4, 2020 on HBO's website.)	0.341
Sarah Edmondson recounted her relationship with her friend and NXIVM member Lauren Salzman and meeting her husband Anthony Ames in NXIVM. Edmondson details her recruitment into DOS by Salzman and her branding ceremony with other DOS members at Allison Mack's home. Edmondson confronts Salzman about Keith Raniere's involvement with DOS after she realised the brand she received is Raniere's initials and not a symbol of the element like she was told. Lauren Salzman denies Raniere's involvement and the creation of the DOS brand. After learning about his wife's branding, Anthony Ames confronts the people in NXIVM and reflects on his involvement with the organisation.
4	4	"Building Character"	Omar Mullick	September 13, 2020	0.304
Mark Vicente and Bonnie Piesse meet Catherine Oxenberg in her Malibu home and warn her about her daughter, India Oxenberg's involvement in DOS. Catherine Oxenberg and Mark Vicente contacted Frank Parlato about DOS, who published the information in the Frank Report with detailed descriptions of DOS. Jane, a former DOS member, recounted her recruitment into DOS and detailed her time there and her eventual sexual relationship with Keith Raniere, who told her, he created DOS and is the head of DOS. Jane begins to question DOS after reading the Frank Report and learning new information about DOS, including the branding of Raniere's initials on DOS members. After sharing her experiences in DOS with another member and realising that she has been traumatised, Jane decides to leave DOS.
5	5	"Class 1 Data"	Jehane Noujaim; Karim Amer	September 20, 2020	0.362
Mark Vicente go to The New York Times about NXIVM and DOS, with Sarah Edmondson and Catherine Oxenberg all agreeing to share their story. Sarah Edmondson reveals NXIVM has filed criminal charges against her with the Vancouver police. Catherine Oxenberg and NYT journalist Barry Meier also received letters from NXIVM threatening legal action. Clare Bronfman and Sara Bronfman's roles in NXIVM are detailed, including financially backing the company and bringing the Dalai Lama to Albany, New York, on behalf of NXIVM.
6	6	"Honesty & Disclosure"	Karim Amer; Jehane Noujaim	September 27, 2020	0.318
The article about NXIVM is finally published by The New York Times. Catherine Oxenberg appears on national television to bring more awareness to NXIVM and her daughter, India Oxenberg. Early NXIVM defectors Susan Dones and Barbara Bouchey share their insight into NXIVM and the emotional, financial and legal fallout after leaving NXIVM. Barbara Bouchey, a former NXIVM board member, also details her relationship with Keith Raniere.
7	7	"Blame & Responsibility"	Jehane Noujaim; Karim Amer	October 4, 2020	0.257
After learning that the New York Attorney General's chief investigator is interested in building a criminal case against NXIVM, Catherine Oxenberg and others attempted to build a dossier of evidence on NXIVM and meet with people, including Frank Parlato and Toni Natalie. Keith Raniere's former girlfriend in the 1990s, Toni Natalie, details her life and relationship with Raniere and the years of torments Raniere subjected her to after their break up.
8	8	"The Wound"	Jehane Noujaim; Karim Amer	October 11, 2020	0.266
Sarah Edmondson, Mark Vicente, and Bonnie Piesse continue to gather evidence and cooperate with the FBI on their investigation of NXIVM. They also explained the men's group "SOP" and women's group "JNESS" and how the curriculums within NXIVM reshaped their ideas on gender roles in society and may have laid the foundation for the secret subgroup, DOS.
9	9	"The Fall"	Jehane Noujaim; Karim Amer	October 18, 2020	0.360
Keith Raniere flees to Mexico. The NXIVM centres in Mexico are explored with members such as Emiliano Salinas. Catherine Oxenberg struggles to get through to her daughter India Oxenberg. Mark Vicente and Bonnie Piesse return to Clifton Park for the first time since leaving NXIVM. Keith Raniere is arrested in Mexico and indicted on charges including sex trafficking, sex trafficking conspiracy, and conspiracy to commit forced labour. Other members, including Allison Mack, Nancy Salzman, and Clare Bronfman, are also arrested.

=== Season 2 (2022) ===
No. overall	No. in season	Title	Directed by	Original release date	U.S. viewers (millions)
10	1	"Tests of Loyalty"	Jehane Noujaim	October 17, 2022	0.143
Keith Raniere is apprehended in Mexico. Prosecutor Moira Penza and defense attorney Marc Agnifilo prep their cases for Raniere's trial. NXIVM co-founder Nancy Salzman, on house arrest, sits down for an interview. Nicki Clyne says that she was in a relationship with Keith Raniere for many years, and Michele Hatchette speaks of Raniere in glowing terms.
11	2	"Rapport"	Jehane Noujaim	October 24, 2022	0.105
Nancy Salzman tells how she met Keith Raniere and the start of NXIVM company. At Raniere's trial, the prosecution calls its first witness, Sylvie, who gives a detailed account of her time in NXIVM and DOS. Mark Vicente also testifies at the trial.
12	3	"Stimulus and Response"	Jehane Noujaim	October 31, 2022	N/A
Nancy Salzman discusses NXIVM's treatment for symptoms of Tourette's. Marc Elliot credits and expresses gratitude to NXIVM for curing his Tourette syndrome. Isabella Constantino, who suffers from Tourette's and joins NXIVM for treatment, details her experience and the negative impact NXIVM had on her life.
13	4	"The Breach"	Jehane Noujaim	November 7, 2022	N/A
Lauren Salzman testifies for the prosecution and details her decades-long relationship with Keith Raniere, including about his arrests in Mexico. Prosecutors and Lauren Salzman give more insights into DOS, the DOS's brand (which consists of Raniere's initials) and the branding of DOS members. Verónica Jaspeado also details her relationship with Keith Raniere and her time in NXIVM and DOS. Nancy Salzman and her daughter Michelle Salzman discuss Lauren and Raniere.
14	5	"The Room"	Jehane Noujaim	November 14, 2022	0.100
Daniela, a witness for the prosecution, recounted the destructive influence NXIVM and Keith Raniere had on her entire family. Daniela details her (and her two sisters') sexual relationship with Keith Raniere and being isolated in a room for two years on Raniere's order. Nancy Salzman pleads guilty after seeing evidence of Keith Raniere's sexual relationship with Daniela's underage sister, Camila.
15	6	"Crime and Punishment"	Karim Amer; Jehane Noujaim	November 21, 2022	0.129
Keith Raniere and Camila's relationship are detailed at the trial. Nicole testifies about being recruited into DOS by Allison Mack and gives a detailed account of her time there with Mack and Raniere. Keith Raniere is found guilty and sentenced to 120 years. Raniere's remaining supporters plan to exonerate him. Verónica, Daniela, and Camila read their victim impact statements. Camila says her sexual relationship with Raniere started in 2005 when she was 15 years old. Nancy Salzman examines her role in NXIVM and is sentenced to 42 months in prison.

== Reception ==
=== Critical response ===
On Rotten Tomatoes, the first season holds an approval rating of 72% based on 29 reviews, with an average rating of 7.6/10. The website's critics consensus reads, "Though The Vow's scope at times exceeds its reach, its empathetic approach to unpacking NXIVM's manipulations and the consequences thereof make for necessary, difficult viewing." On Metacritic, the series has a weighted average score of 76 out of 100, based on 15 critics, indicating "generally favorable reviews".

In year-end best of 2020 television and documentary lists, The Vow found itself on the lists of The Washington Post, The Los Angeles Times, Entertainment Weekly, Variety, Thrillist, Concrete Playground, and The Lineup. A number of reviews praised The Vow's intimate exploration, measured pace and extensive footage, but criticized its abstract storytelling and focus. In a positive review, Adrian Horton of The Guardian wrote that "as a portrait of manipulation and, in particular, the masking of female abuse through self-effacement, the series is darkly compelling, unnerving in a way that’s hard to shake," but conceded "[it] deceptively muddies the timeline of the group’s development." Variety's Daniel D'Addario wrote that "The Vow pushes back against its slack pace to become television that compels — both for the access it has and for what it does with that access." Richard Lawson writing in Vanity Fair, was critical stating: "The Vow meanders through the downward arc of a cult’s fall, but gives us little sense of its history." The A.V. Club's Ashley Ray-Harris was less impressed and attributed the "wasted nine hours" and selective content to the (former NXIVM) filmmakers' desire to "get ahead of the curve with their own narrative." Maureen Ryan of the New York Times, in an otherwise positive review described the series as "only scratch[ing] the surface" and "padded... repetitive."

On Rotten Tomatoes, the second season has an approval rating of 64% based on 11 reviews, with an average rating of 2.6/10. The website's critics consensus states, "While this second installment of The Vow wouldn't have enough meat on the bone to sustain itself as a self-contained docuseries, it succeeds as an introspective supplement that deepens what came before." On Metacritic, the season has a weighted average score of 79 out of 100, based on 4 critics, indicating "generally favorable reviews".

=== Accolades ===
Year	Award	Category	Nominees	Result	Ref.
2021	Cinema Eye Honors	Outstanding Cinematography in a Broadcast Film or Series	Ian Moubayed & Sam Price-Waldman	Nominated	
2021	Critics' Choice Real TV Awards	Best Crime/Justice Show	The Vow	Nominated	
2021	Critics' Choice Real TV Awards	Best Ongoing Documentary Series	The Vow	Nominated	
2021	Hollywood Critics Association	Best Broadcast Network or Cable Docuseries, Documentary Television Movie, or Non-Fiction Series	The Vow	Nominated	

=== Season 1 ===
Viewership and ratings per episode of The Vow
No.	Title	Air date	Rating (18–49)	Viewers (millions)
1	"The Science of Joy"	August 23, 2020	0.07	0.342
2	"Viscera"	August 30, 2020	0.09	0.338
3	"At Cause"	September 6, 2020	0.06	0.341
4	"Building Character"	September 13, 2020	0.05	0.304
5	"Class 1 Data"	September 20, 2020	0.08	0.362
6	"Honesty & Disclosure"	September 27, 2020	0.09	0.318
7	"The Dossier"	October 4, 2020	0.06	0.257
8	"The Wound"	October 11, 2020	0.05	0.266
9	"The Fall"	October 18, 2020	0.07	0.360

=== Season 2 ===
Viewership and ratings per episode of The Vow
No.	Title	Air date	Rating (18–49)	Viewers (millions)
1	"Tests of Loyalty"	October 17, 2022	0.03	0.143
2	"Rapport"	October 24, 2022	0.03	0.105
5	"The Room"	November 14, 2022	0.02	0.100
6	"Crime and Punishment"	November 21, 2022	0.03	0.129

== See also ==
- Seduced: Inside the NXIVM Cult
- Escaping the NXIVM Cult: A Mother's Fight to Save Her Daughter
