= Nicki Clyne =

Canadian actress (born 1983)

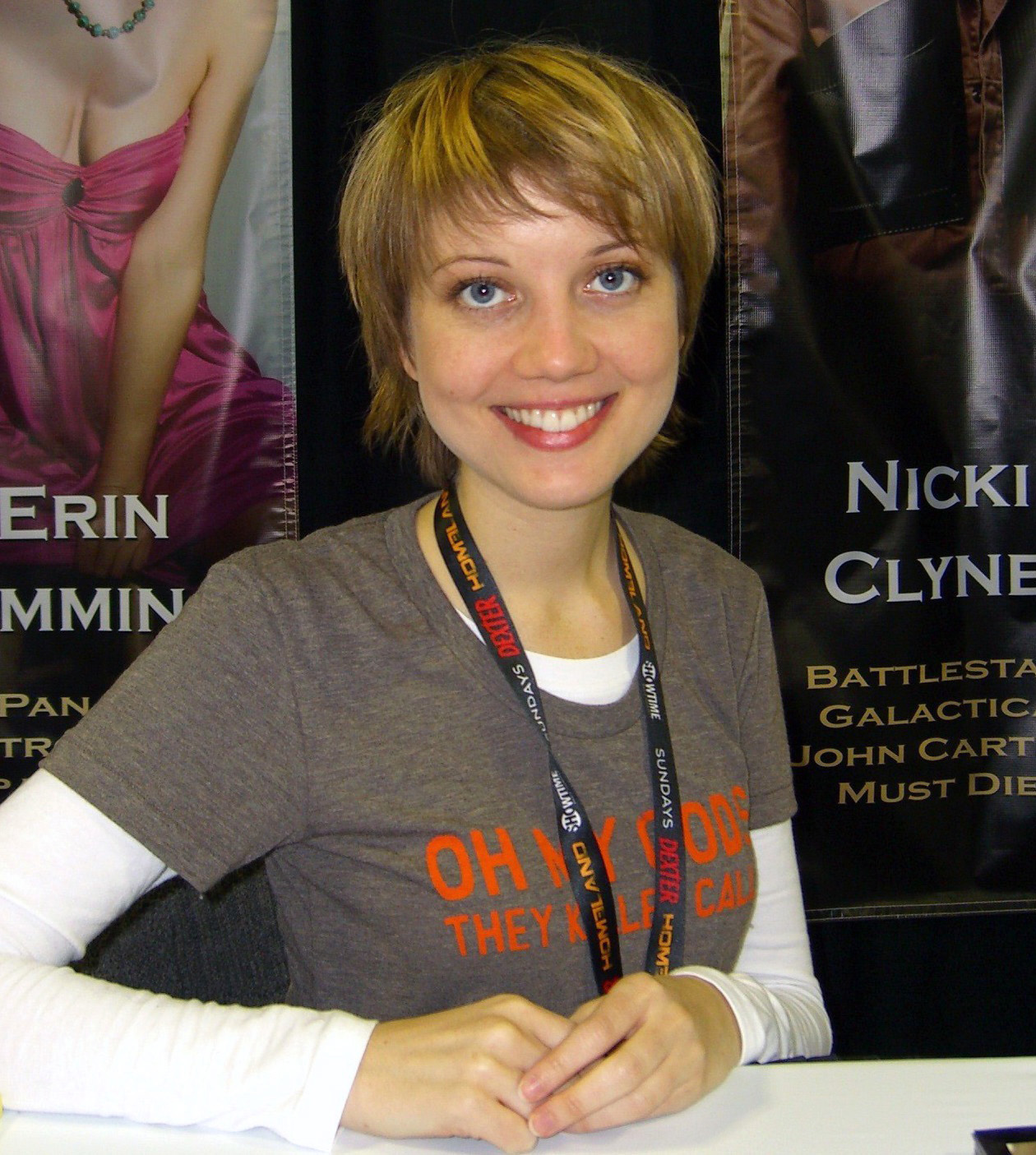
- Clyne at the 2011 New York Comic Con
- Born: February 1983 (age 43); Vancouver, British Columbia, Canada
- Occupation: Actress
- Years active: 2000–present
- Notable work: Battlestar Galactica
- Spouse(s): Allison Mack (m. 2017; div.) (Note: Divorce papers filed in December 2020, no citation to confirm if completed that month or carried over into a following year. The divorce had been granted in the 2020s, as Mack was able to remarry in June 2025.)
- Website: nickiclyne.com

Nicki Clyne (born February 1983) is a Canadian actress, known for her role as Cally Henderson on the SyFy television series Battlestar Galactica. Clyne was a member of NXIVM, a cult founded by Keith Raniere. Clyne has since denounced Raniere, posting on her personal Twitter account a blog post she wrote for the Frank Report.

== Career ==
Clyne is known for her role as Cally Henderson in the 2003 reimagining of Battlestar Galactica. Like several members of the cast, she was originally cast in a minor, non-recurring role but, having impressed the showrunners, became a major part of the series until her character's death in season four. Prior to Battlestar Galactica, she had guest parts on sci-fi and supernatural shows including Dark Angel, Smallville, The Twilight Zone, and The Dead Zone. In 2018, she appeared with fellow Battlestar alumnus Richard Hatch in the web series Personal Space.

She was also featured in two episodes of the podcast Tiki Bar TV, and presented an episode of HypaSpace. She stars alongside Lance Henriksen, Danielle Harris, Bill Moseley, and AFI's Davey Havok in the "illustrated film" series Godkiller. Clyne hosted two seasons of Syfy's Blastr TV, covering science fiction pop culture and events. She appeared in the independent film Lunamancer.

== NXIVM ==
Clyne was a member of NXIVM, a now defunct multi-level marketing large-group awareness training company founded by Keith Raniere and headquartered in Albany, New York. She states she attended her first NXIVM event in November 2005, an "intensive with Executive Success Programs (ESP)," one of several NXIVM companies. Prosecutors dismantled NXIVM's corporation structures in 2020 by seizing First Principles Inc., the company with title to NXIVM and Keith Raniere's intellectual property. Following Raniere's 2019 conviction of human trafficking and sexual abuse, Clyne continued to support Raniere and advocated for his release. Clyne was among the remaining NXIVM members who continued to defend NXIVM and its practice. On March 27, 2023, the Frank Report published a statement from Clyne stating that she would no longer defend Keith Raniere.

=== NXIVM and DOS ===
In 2014, NXIVM adherent Rosa Laura Junco (daughter of Alejandro Junco de la Vega) founded the media organization The Knife of Aristotle, later shortened to The Knife. Clyne was given a job with the organization, and was credited as its "Executive Producer".

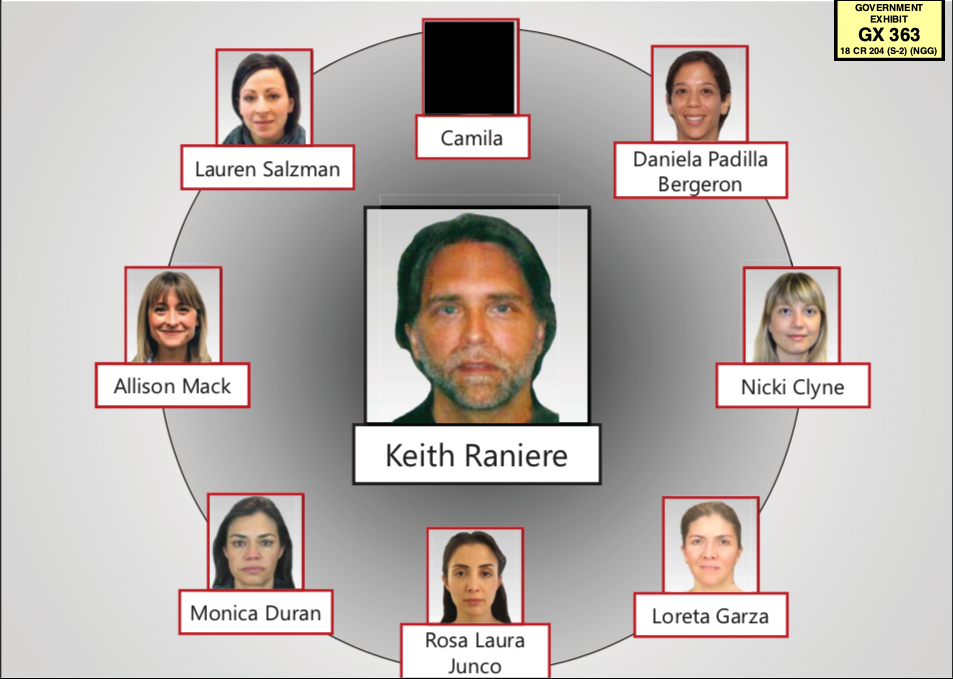
US v. Raniere prosecution exhibit – diagram of DOS 'first-line slaves'

By Clyne's own account, she helped Keith Raniere found a "secret sisterhood" that started in 2015 called "DOS" (also known as "the Sorority", and "the Vow"). The United States Attorney for the Eastern District of New York said that DOS was arranged as a pyramidal organization, with Raniere at the apex and subordinates Clyne, Allison Mack and others as its "First Line". The First Line were Raniere's direct slaves, instructed to become "masters" by recruiting slaves of their own. The slaves of the First Line (and below) were to treat Raniere as "Grandmaster," but were not allowed at first to know of Raniere's participation.

The DOS sorority required a number of acts of devotion involving masochism or submission. These acts included ceremonies conducted in the nude, one involving branding with a symbol that (undisclosed to several recipients) was a monogram of the initials of Keith A Raniere. Members were instructed to provide humiliating photos and derogatory information about themselves as "collateral" used to blackmail them into obedience. At Raniere's trial, several recruits to DOS indicated their masters told them to have sex with Keith Raniere or an individual acting as his proxy. The group also practiced forms of corporal punishment ("penances") as well as severe caloric restriction and sleep deprivation.

In October 2017, The New York Times ran an expose of Raniere, NXIVM, and its relationship to DOS. The article featured Sarah Edmondson, who gave her account of the branding ceremony. Raniere fled to Mexico in November 2017. Clyne later accidentally revealed his location on her Instagram, sharing a photo of a Puerto Vallarta landmark that revealed his whereabouts to the FBI. In March 2018, Mexican police raided the vacation home where Raniere and DOS members Clyne, Mack, and Lauren Salzman were staying. The Mexican government deported Raniere, and he was arrested by the United States. Lauren Salzman later testified that the day of the raid was supposed to be a "recommitment ceremony" involving group sex with Raniere.

After Raniere's arrest, a grand jury in the United States District Court for the Eastern District of New York continued investigating Raniere and his associates, including Clyne. In addition to Keith Raniere, prosecutors charged Allison Mack, Clare Bronfman, and several others for activities involving either DOS or NXIVM. Several were indicted in a racketeering enterprise indictment centering on human and sex trafficking of NXIVM and DOS members, as well as illegal acts targeting enemies of the organization. In the course of the investigation, the government subpoenaed Clyne to testify before the grand jury. She invoked her Fifth Amendment rights against self-incrimination, and was not indicted.

At Raniere's trial, cooperating witness Lauren Salzman (a fellow DOS "First Line" member) testified that Clyne joined her in editing the recording of Sarah Edmondson's branding in a failed bid to preempt the October 2017 report in The New York Times.

Salzman also testified at trial to the existence of a DOS "Sorority House" in Halfmoon, New York which hosted events where DOS slaves paddled and whipped one another, and where DOS slaves planned "seduction assignments" intended to traffic women for Raniere's gratification. Sex toys including a human-size cage and puppy play gear were also introduced as evidence the house was used for human and sex trafficking.

An FBI agent's affidavit supporting asset forfeiture indicates that while Rosa Laura Junco provided funds and owned the LLC that bought the DOS Sorority House, Clyne was Managing Member of the LLC and her passport included in purchase paperwork. After the DOS Sorority House was sold in 2018, proceeds were deposited into a trust account held by Clyne's lawyer, Edward Sapone. After Raniere's conviction, a magistrate judge authorized the seizure of the funds in August 2019.

In a 2020 prosecution memorandum opposing the retrial of Keith Raniere, prosecutors stated their position that "the cache of DOS materials, including collateral, in Clyne's possession is the product of fraud and extortion, as was demonstrated at trial." Devising restitution for the victims of Raniere, Judge Nicholas Garaufis ordered that as restitution, "all lower-ranking DOS members are statutorily entitled to the return of their collateral." Due to Fifth Amendment concerns, this order was stayed until 60 days after the ruling on Raniere's appeal to the United States Court of Appeals for the Second Circuit. The Circuit ruled Raniere's appeal was "without merit" on December 9, 2022.

=== Activities since the conviction of Keith Raniere ===
Following Raniere's conviction, Clyne and other NXIVM members launched an activist group We Are As You and accompanying website WeAreTheForgottenOnes.org. The members of the organization danced outside of Metropolitan Detention Center, Brooklyn, where Raniere was detained. The group faced backlash from former NXIVM members for using the #BlackLivesMatter hashtag on its social media posts and questioning why it only targeted the prison where Raniere is located, and how it could serve as a possible attempt to recruit new members.

In August 2020, the government filed exhibits ahead of Raniere's sentencing indicating that he sent messages to Clyne through the Federal Bureau of Prisons-monitored TRULINCS email system, the contents of which include messages condemning government witnesses for having "broken vows," and calling them "apostate sorority sisters."

In September 2020, one month before Raniere was sentenced to 120 years in prison, Clyne spoke out in his defense in an interview with CBS News This Morning. Footage of Clyne was used in season one of the HBO documentary series The Vow. In the show's second season, she is interviewed on camera, continuing to defend Raniere despite others, particularly Sarah Edmondson, expressing regret for having enticed her into NXIVM.

Clyne has a verified Twitter account. Since Raniere's conviction, she has used it to advocate on his behalf; the Times Union has documented that this included an alleged threat to publicly identify Raniere's sex trafficking victims who were granted anonymity by court order. In April 2022, Clyne used her account to share a copy of a motion related to Keith Raniere's appeal, which claims that the FBI framed Keith Raniere.

Clyne appears on a number of social media outlets expressing support for causes célèbres of conservatism in the United States in addition to stating Raniere's innocence. She has appeared on video in conversation with Scott Adams, Destiny, and James A. Lindsay. Clyne's comments in support of Kyle Rittenhouse were shared by Rep. Claudia Tenney (R-NY).

Through a filing by the U.S. Attorney, the Bureau maintains that, "[Raniere] circumvented mail monitoring by communicating with Ms. Clyne through another inmate and using her to communicate with Clare Bronfman, a NXIVM associate and co-defendant of Plaintiff who is serving time in federal prison."

=== Civil lawsuit ===
Clyne, Mack, and other NXIVM associates were named as defendants in a civil lawsuit filed in federal court by 80 former NXIVM members in January 2020. The lawsuit accuses the NXIVM organization of being a pyramid scheme, exploiting its recruits, conducting illegal human experiments, and making it "physically and psychologically difficult, and in some cases impossible, to leave the coercive community." Clyne defended herself pro se, and in a statement says, "I do not have any assets that would grant any relief or compensation for the Plaintiffs' alleged hardships... I have a 2011 Subaru to my name." In 2023, the plaintiffs dismissed the claims against Clyne, without prejudice.

== Personal life ==
Clyne has given statements to a federal court and the press that she was a sexual partner of Keith Raniere for over a decade. Clyne married American actress Allison Mack, a fellow member of NXIVM and DOS in 2017. The marriage was alleged to be a sham to keep Clyne in the United States. A witness at the ceremony later confirmed the marriage was fake. Mack filed paperwork in Orange County, California to divorce Clyne in 2020.

== Filmography ==
=== Film ===
Year	Title	Role	Notes
2004	Saved!	Guitar Player	
2004	Ill Fated	Barb	
2006	John Tucker Must Die	Beautiful Girl No. 2	
2010	Godkiller	Soledad (voice)	
2010	Godkiller: Walk Among Us	Soledad (voice)	
2021	Lunamancer	Sue Blake	

=== Television ===
Year	Title	Role	Notes
2000	Just Deal	Girl Student No. 2	Episode: "Homecoming"
2001	Level 9	Alesha	Episode: "Avatar"
2001	Hostage Negotiator	Alicia	TV film
2001	Dark Angel	Fixit / X6	Episode: "Bag 'Em"
2002	Smallville	Talon Waitress	Episode: "Nicodemus"
2002	Mysterious Ways	June Grissom	Episode: "Listen"
2002	Due East	Stacy	TV film
2002	Damaged Care	Bryanna's College Friend	TV film
2002	I Was a Teenage Faust	Heather	TV film
2002	The Twilight Zone	Theresa	Episode: "Night Route"
2003	The Dead Zone	Erin Salkowe	Episode: "Descent"
2003	Battlestar Galactica	Cally	TV miniseries
2004	The L Word	Delilah	Episode: "Losing It"
2004	Zolar	Keiko	TV film
2004	Dead Like Me	Janelle	Episode: "In Escrow"
2004–2008	Battlestar Galactica	Cally Henderson Tyrol	Recurring role (36 episodes)
2005	Tiki Bar TV	Space Cadet	TV series
2006	Battlestar Galactica: The Resistance	Crewman Specialist Cally Tyrol	Webseries
2006	Totally Awesome	Billie	TV film

=== Audio books ===
Year	Title	Role	Notes
2013	World War Z	Sharon	

=== Web videos ===
Year	Title	Role	Notes
2018	Personal Space	Gail Gartner	Published through Prime Video Direct
