= What the Bleep Do We Know!? =

2004 film by William Arntz

- Promotional poster
- Directed by: William Arntz; Betsy Chasse; Mark Vicente
- Written by: William Arntz; Matthew Hoffman; Betsy Chasse; Mark Vicente
- Produced by: William Arntz; Betsy Chasse; Mark Vicente
- Cinematography: David Bridges; Mark Vicente
- Edited by: Jonathan Shaw
- Music by: Christopher Franke
- Production companies: Captured Light; Lord of the Wind
- Distributed by: Roadside Attractions; Samuel Goldwyn Films
- Release dates: April 23, 2004 (Phoenix); June 18, 2004 (LA); September 10, 2004 (New York City)
- Running time: 109 minutes
- Country: United States
- Languages: English; Spanish; German
- Box office: $21.1 million

What the Bleep Do We Know!? (stylized as What tнē #$*! D̄ө ωΣ (k)πow!? and What the #$*! Do We Know!?) is a 2004 American pseudo-scientific film that posits a spiritual connection between quantum physics and consciousness (as part of a belief system known as quantum mysticism). The plot follows the fictional story of a photographer, using documentary-style interviews and computer-animated graphics, as she encounters emotional and existential obstacles in her life and begins to consider the idea that individual and group consciousness can influence the material world. Her experiences are offered by the creators to illustrate the film's scientifically unsupported ideas.

Bleep was conceived and its production funded by William Arntz, who serves as co-director along with Betsy Chasse and Mark Vicente; all three were students of Ramtha's School of Enlightenment. A moderately low-budget independent film, it was promoted using viral marketing methods and opened in art-house theaters in the western United States, winning several independent film awards before being picked up by a major distributor and eventually grossing over $10 million. The 2004 theatrical release was succeeded by a substantially changed, extended home media version in 2006.

The film has been described as an example of quantum mysticism, and has been criticized for both misrepresenting science and containing pseudoscience. While many of its interviewees and subjects are professional scientists in the fields of physics, chemistry, and biology, one of them has noted that the film quotes him out of context.

== Synopsis ==
Filmed in Portland, Oregon, What the Bleep Do We Know!? presents a viewpoint of the physical universe and human life within it, with connections to neuroscience and quantum physics. Some ideas discussed in the film are:

- That the universe is best seen as constructed from thoughts and ideas rather than from matter.
- That "empty space" is not empty.
- That matter is not solid, and electrons are able to pop in and out of existence without it being known where they disappear to.
- That beliefs about who one is and what is real are a direct cause of oneself and of one's own realities.
- That peptides produced by the brain can cause a bodily reaction to emotion.

In the narrative segments of the film, Marlee Matlin portrays Amanda, a photographer who plays the role of everywoman as she experiences her life from startlingly new and different perspectives.

In the documentary segments of the film, interviewees discuss the roots and meaning of Amanda's experiences. The comments focus primarily on a single theme: "We create our own reality." The director, William Arntz, has described What the Bleep as a film for the "metaphysical left".

== Cast ==
- Marlee Matlin as Amanda
- Elaine Hendrix as Jennifer
- Barry Newman as Frank
- Robert Bailey Jr. as Reggie
- John Ross Bowie as Elliot
- Armin Shimerman as Man
- Robert Blanche as Bob
- Larry Brandenburg as Bruno
- Patti B. Collins as Mother of the Bride

== Production ==
Work was split between Toronto-based Mr. X Inc., Lost Boys Studios in Vancouver, and Atomic Visual Effects in Cape Town, South Africa. The visual-effects team, led by Evan Jacobs, worked closely with the other film-makers to create visual metaphors that would capture the essence of the film's technical subjects with attention to aesthetic detail.

== Release ==
=== Promotion ===
Lacking the funding and resources of the typical Hollywood film, the filmmakers relied on "guerrilla marketing" first to get the film into theaters, and then to attract audiences. This has led to accusations, both formal and informal, directed towards the film's proponents, of spamming online message boards and forums with many thinly veiled promotional posts. Initially, the film was released in only two theaters: one in Yelm, Washington (the home of the producers, which is also the home of Ramtha), and the other the Bagdad Theater in Portland, Oregon, where it was filmed. Within several weeks, the film had appeared in a dozen or more theaters (mostly in the western United States), and within six months it had made its way into 200 theaters across the US.

=== Box office ===
According to Publishers Weekly, the film was one of the sleeper hits of 2004, as "word-of-mouth and strategic marketing kept it in theaters for an entire year." The article states that the domestic gross exceeded $10 million, described as not bad for a low-budget documentary, and that the DVD release attained even more significant success with over a million units shipped in the first six months following its release in March 2005. Foreign gross added another $5 million for a worldwide gross of just over $21 million.

=== Critical response ===
In the Publishers Weekly article, publicist Linda Rienecker of New Page Books says that she sees the success as part of a wider phenomenon, stating "A large part of the population is seeking spiritual connections, and they have the whole world to choose from now". Author Barrie Dolnick adds that "people don't want to learn how to do one thing. They'll take a little bit of Buddhism, a little bit of veganism, a little bit of astrology... They're coming into the marketplace hungry for direction, but they don't want some person who claims to have all the answers. They want suggestions, not formulas." The same article quotes Bill Pfau, Advertising Manager of Inner Traditions, as saying "More and more ideas from the New Age community have become accepted into the mainstream."

Critics offered mixed reviews as seen on the film review website Rotten Tomatoes, where it scored a "Rotten" 34% score with an average score of 4.6/10, based on 77 reviews. In his review, Dave Kehr of The New York Times described the "transition from quantum mechanics to cognitive therapy" as "plausible", but stated also that "the subsequent leap—from cognitive therapy into large, hazy spiritual beliefs—isn't as effectively executed. Suddenly people who were talking about subatomic particles are alluding to alternate universes and cosmic forces, all of which can be harnessed in the interest of making Ms. Matlin's character feel better about her thighs."

What the Bleep Do We Know!? has been described as "a kind of New Age answer to The Passion of the Christ and other films that adhere to traditional religious teachings." It offers alternative spirituality views characteristic of New Age philosophy, including critiques of the competing claims of stewardship among traditional religions [viz., institutional Judaism, Christianity, and Islam] of universally recognized and accepted moral values.

=== Academic reaction ===
Scientists who have reviewed What the Bleep Do We Know!? have described distinct assertions made as pseudoscience. Lisa Randall refers to the film as "the bane of scientists". Amongst the assertions in the film that have been challenged are that water molecules can be influenced by thought (as popularized by Masaru Emoto), that meditation can reduce violent crime rates of a city, and that quantum physics implies that "consciousness is the ground of all being." The film was also discussed in a letter published in Physics Today that challenges how physics is taught, saying teaching fails to "expose the mysteries physics has encountered [and] reveal the limits of our understanding". In the letter, the authors write: "the movie illustrates the uncertainty principle with a bouncing basketball being in several places at once. There's nothing wrong with that. It's recognized as pedagogical exaggeration. But the movie gradually moves to quantum 'insights' that lead a woman to toss away her antidepressant medication, to the quantum channeling of Ramtha, the 35,000-year-old Lemurian warrior, and on to even greater nonsense." It went on to say that "Most laypeople cannot tell where the quantum physics ends and the quantum nonsense begins, and many are susceptible to being misguided," and that "a physics student may be unable to convincingly confront unjustified extrapolations of quantum mechanics," a shortcoming which the authors attribute to the current teaching of quantum mechanics, in which "we tacitly deny the mysteries physics has encountered".

Richard Dawkins stated that "the authors seem undecided whether their theme is quantum theory or consciousness. Both are indeed mysterious, and their genuine mystery needs none of the hype with which this film relentlessly and noisily belabours us", concluding that the film is "tosh". Professor Clive Greated wrote that "thinking on neurology and addiction are covered in some detail but, unfortunately, early references in the film to quantum physics are not followed through, leading to a confused message". Despite his caveats, he recommends that people see the film, stating: "I hope it develops into a cult movie in the UK as it has in the US. Science and engineering are important for our future, and anything that engages the public can only be a good thing." Simon Singh called it pseudoscience and said the suggestion "that if observing water changes its molecular structure, and if we are 90% water, then by observing ourselves we can change at a fundamental level via the laws of quantum physics" was "ridiculous balderdash". According to João Magueijo, professor in theoretical physics at Imperial College, the film deliberately misquotes science. The American Chemical Society's review criticizes the film as a "pseudoscientific docudrama", saying "Among the more outlandish assertions are that people can travel backward in time, and that matter is actually thought."

Bernie Hobbs, a science writer with ABC Science Online, explains why the film is incorrect about quantum physics and reality: "The observer effect of quantum physics isn't about people or reality. It comes from the Heisenberg Uncertainty Principle, and it's about the limitations of trying to measure the position and momentum of subatomic particles... this only applies to sub-atomic particles—a rock doesn't need you to bump into it to exist. It's there. The sub-atomic particles that make up the atoms that make up the rock are there too." Hobbs also discusses Hagelin's experiment with Transcendental Meditation and the Washington DC rate of violent crime, saying that "the number of murders actually went up". Hobbs further disputed the film's use of the ten percent of the brain myth.

David Albert, a philosopher of physics who appears in the film, has accused the filmmakers of selectively editing his interview to make it appear that he endorses the film's thesis that quantum mechanics is linked with consciousness. He says he is "profoundly unsympathetic to attempts at linking quantum mechanics with consciousness".

In the film, during a discussion of the influence of experience on perception, Candace Pert gives an apocryphal version of the invisible ships myth whereby Native Americans were unable to see Columbus's ships because they were outside the natives' experience. According to an article in Fortean Times by David Hambling, the origins of this story likely involved the voyages of Captain James Cook, not Columbus, and an account related by Robert Hughes which said Cook's ships were "...complex and unfamiliar as to defy the natives' understanding". Hambling says it is likely that both the Hughes account and the story told by Pert were exaggerations of the records left by Captain Cook and the botanist Joseph Banks.

Skeptic James Randi described the film as "a fantasy docudrama" and "[a] rampant example of abuse by charlatans and cults". Eric Scerri in a review for Committee for Skeptical Inquiry dismisses it as "a hodgepodge of all kinds of crackpot nonsense," where "science [is] distorted and sensationalized". A BBC reviewer described it as "a documentary aimed at the totally gullible".

According to Margaret Wertheim, "History abounds with religious enthusiasts who have read spiritual portent into the arrangement of the planets, the vacuum of space, electromagnetic waves and the big bang. But no scientific discovery has proved so ripe for spiritual projection as the theories of quantum physics, replete with their quixotic qualities of uncertainty, simultaneity and parallelism." Wertheim continues that the film "abandons itself entirely to the ecstasies of quantum mysticism, finding in this aleatory description of nature the key to spiritual transformation. As one of the film's characters gushes early in the proceedings, 'The moment we acknowledge the quantum self, we say that somebody has become enlightened'. A moment in which 'the mathematical formalisms of quantum mechanics [...] are stripped of all empirical content and reduced to a set of syrupy nostrums'."

Journalist John Gorenfeld, writing in Salon, notes that the film's three directors, William Arntz, Betsy Chasse, and Mark Vicente, were at the time students of Ramtha's School of Enlightenment, which he says has been described as a cult. Mark Vicente later became involved with another prominent cult: NXIVM, the human-potential-development and sex-trafficking pyramid scheme founded by convicted con artist Keith Raniere. After leaving NXIVM, Vicente participated in the exposé documentary series The Vow, revealing many of the cult's damaging tactics; however, nowhere in The Vow does Vicente admit that NXIVM was not his first time adhering to a cult-like group.

=== Accolades ===
- Ashland Independent Film Festival – Best Documentary
- DCIFF – DC Independent Film Festival – Grand Jury Documentary Award
- Maui Film Festival – Audience Choice Award – Best Hybrid Documentary
- Sedona International Film Festival – Audience Choice Award, Most Thought-Provoking Film
- Pigasus Award – an annual tongue-in-cheek award, this particular award's category was #3: "to the media outlet that reported as factual the most outrageous supernatural, paranormal or occult claims".

== Legacy ==
In mid-2005, the filmmakers worked with HCI Books to expand on the themes in a book titled What the Bleep Do We Know!?—Discovering the Endless Possibilities of Your Everyday Reality. HCI president Peter Vegso stated that in regard to this book, "What the Bleep is the quantum leap in the New Age world," and "by marrying science and spirituality, it is the foundation of future thought."

On August 1, 2006, What the Bleep! Down the Rabbit Hole - Quantum Edition multi-disc DVD set was released, containing two extended versions of What the Bleep Do We Know!?, with over 15 hours of material on three double-sided DVDs.

== See also ==
- Mind-body problem
- Hard problem of consciousness
- Law of attraction
- List of films featuring the deaf and hard of hearing
