= Sarah Edmundson =

Sarah Edmundson may refer to:

- Sarah Emma Edmonds (1841–1898)
- Sarah Edmondson (born 1977)
