= Sara Bronfman =

American marketing executive

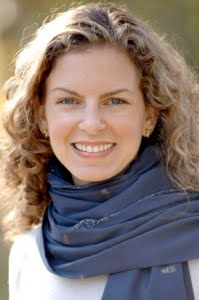
- Born: Sara Rosner Bronfman; 1976 (age 49–50)
- Known for: NXIVM
- Spouse: Basit Igtet (m. 2012)
- Children: 1
- Parent(s): Edgar Bronfman Sr; Georgiana Bronfman Havers (née Rita Webb)
- Relatives: Clare Bronfman (sister)

Sara Rosner Bronfman (born 1976) is the daughter of the billionaire former Seagram chairman Edgar Bronfman Sr. Bronfman was a leading funder and a member of the leadership team for the controversial multi-level marketing company and cult NXIVM, as was her sister, Clare Bronfman.

== Background ==
Bronfman's father, Canadian billionaire Edgar Bronfman Sr., met her mother, Rita Webb, the daughter of an English pub owner from Essex, England, in Marbella, Spain. Webb changed her first name to Georgiana and married Bronfman in 1975, two years after his divorce from his first wife, investment-banking heiress Ann Loeb. Webb gave birth to Sara the following year, then Clare two and a half years later. Her father is of Jewish background.

Shortly after Clare's birth, Georgiana asked Edgar for a divorce. After Edgar married again in 1980, then was again divorced, the two sisters visited their father at his homes in the US: outside Charlottesville, Virginia; in Westchester County; at Sun Valley; and on Fifth Avenue in New York City, though their lives were centered in England and in Kenya, with their mother.

== NXIVM leadership and funding ==
In 2001, 25-year old Bronfman was introduced to NXIVM by a family friend. NXIVM was a multi-level marketing organization founded by Keith Raniere that claimed to help individuals achieve self-discovery, offering personal and professional development seminars, but has subsequently been identified as a cult.

Bronfman has described herself, prior to discovering NXIVM, as "dilettantish". After her introduction to NXIVM, Sara urged Clare, then 23, to become involved. Clare was then committed to her equestrian career as a competitive jumper, horse trainer and owner of Slate River Farm; she was described as being "a bit withdrawn and certainly the type to stay in and read while everyone else goes out."

Sara and Clare became committed followers and financial backers of both NXIVM and its leader, Keith Raniere, and relocated to upstate New York to work as NXIVM trainers. "As Sara would later explain on her blog," wrote Suzanna Andrews in a profile of the sisters for Vanity Fair, "she was 'in search of finding ways to bring peace to the world.' According to [a] family friend, who put it more prosaically, she was desperately looking for some purpose in her life. And she found it at NXIVM."

Bronfman began working with Raniere's company Executive Success Programs, Inc. (ESP) and its "proprietary technology" Rational Inquiry, which had been created by Raniere.

According to one source: "She founded the company's VIP Programs, which provide distinguished individuals with special training and coaching. These programs[,] facilitated by the company's President Nancy Salzman, were responsible for launching ESP into the British and Irish markets in 2005." Soon Sara Bronfman was on the Executive Board of ESP and had become "Director of Humanities, Regional Vice President, Professional Coach and Head Trainer".

In September 2018, a class-action lawsuit was filed against Bronfman in the Brooklyn Supreme Court, asserting that she "ensnared" Isabella Martinez and Gabrielle Leal, among others, into taking costly classes as part of "a fraudulent scheme nationwide" for Raniere and NXIVM.

Bronfman and her husband founded the Athal Education Group, a France-based offshoot of Raniere's Rainbow Cultural Garden, as well as the UK branch of RCG itself. The school was closed by the authorities in 2020. On June 19, 2019, NXIVM founder Raniere was found guilty of sex trafficking and racketeering. At trial, prosecution witness and NXIVM defector Mark Vicente testified that Sara Bronfman was among Raniere's "trusted group".

On January 28, 2020, Sara and Clare Bronfman were named as defendants when 80 former NXIVM members sued, saying they were victims of sex trafficking, forced labor and illegal human experiments, and the NXIVM organisation being a pyramid scheme.

=== Collaboration with the Dalai Lama ===
Eager to distance themselves from cult allegations in the press, NXIVM members sought the endorsement of the Dalai Lama, spending $2 million on the project. Sara, along with her sister, Clare Bronfman, and NXIVM founder Keith Raniere formed an organization called the World Ethical Foundations Consortium (WEFC).

In January 2009, after the Dalai Lama cancelled a planned visit to the Special Olympics World Winter Games in Idaho, Bronfman wrote a letter to an Idaho newspaper in which she threatened to "formally resign as an honorary board member of the Special Olympics if it turned out that the Dalai Lama had been dis-invited by no fault of his own".

Sara and Clare were credited with being able to bring the Dalai Lama to Albany to participate in the WEFC's inaugural event on May 6, 2009, where the Dalai Lama gave a talk; during the event, he presented Raniere with a white scarf onstage. The Dalai Lama additionally wrote the foreword to the book The Sphinx and Thelxiepeia, which Raniere co-authored in 2009. Eight years later, in 2017, it was revealed that in 2009 Bronfman had a sexual relationship with Lama Tenzin Dhonden, the Dalai Lama's gatekeeper who arranged the appearance, who, being a monk, had taken a vow of celibacy. Amid accusations of corruption, Dhonden was replaced.

== Libyan involvement ==
In November 2011, Sara Bronfman traveled to Libya with fellow NXIVM member (and future spouse) Basit Igtet, accompanied by consultants including Adam Hock and Joseph Hagin. In 2012, Igtet and Bronfman founded the Canada-Libya Chamber of Commerce, serving as its inaugural president and chairman of the board respectively.

== Personal life ==
In the early 2000s, Bronfman married Irish jockey Ronan Clarke. They divorced after four months.

In 2009, Bronfman reportedly had a sexual relationship with Lama Tenzin Dhonden, the self-styled "Personal Emissary for Peace for the Dalai Lama"; the affair was made public after a 2017 investigation led to Dhonden's removal for corruption.

In 2012, Bronfman married Libyan businessman Basit Igtet; the couple have one daughter.
