= Mark Vicente =

South African filmmaker (born 1965)

- Born: 1965 (age 60–61); South Africa
- Occupations: Filmmaker, director, producer
- Years active: 1990s–present
- Known for: Co-directing What the Bleep Do We Know!?; former member and whistleblower of NXIVM; appearing in The Vow
- Spouse: Bonnie Piesse

Mark Vicente (born 1965) is a South African filmmaker. He is best known as a co-director of the 2004 film What the Bleep Do We Know!? and for his involvement in—and subsequent whistleblowing against—NXIVM, an organization whose activities were widely reported in international media and examined in the HBO documentary series The Vow.

== Early life and career ==
Mark Vicente was born in South Africa in 1965. He began his career working in film production, including roles in cinematography and camera operation, before moving into directing and producing.

== Filmmaking ==
Vicente co-directed, co-wrote, and co-produced the 2004 independent film What the Bleep Do We Know!?, which combined narrative storytelling with interviews and explored themes related to quantum physics and spirituality. The film achieved commercial success as an independent production but drew criticism for promoting pseudoscientific ideas.

He is also the director of the 2026 feature-length documentary film Narcissist's Playbook, a documentary about narcissism. It features Sam Vaknin, an Israeli author and academic who came to understand his own narcissism and now writes and lectures about it.

== NXIVM ==
Vicente became involved with NXIVM, a self-help organization led by Keith Raniere, in the mid-2000s. He rose to a senior position within the organization and worked closely with its leadership, producing promotional videos and recruiting members.

He left NXIVM in 2017 after becoming aware of allegations of abuse within the group. Vicente later became a key witness for the prosecution in the 2019 federal trial of Raniere.

During his testimony, Vicente described the internal structure of the organization and alleged abuses, including coercive practices involving female members.

== The Vow ==
Vicente is a central figure in the HBO documentary series The Vow (2020), which chronicles NXIVM and the experiences of former members. The series follows Vicente and others as they document their involvement in NXIVM and their efforts to expose the organization.

Reviewing the series, several publications noted Vicente's central role in documenting the group's internal culture and eventual collapse.

== Personal life ==
Vicente is married to actress Bonnie Piesse, who was also involved in NXIVM before leaving the organization.
