= NXIVM =

North American cult and pyramid scheme

Coordinates: 42.7414°N 73.8401°W

NXIVM Corporation

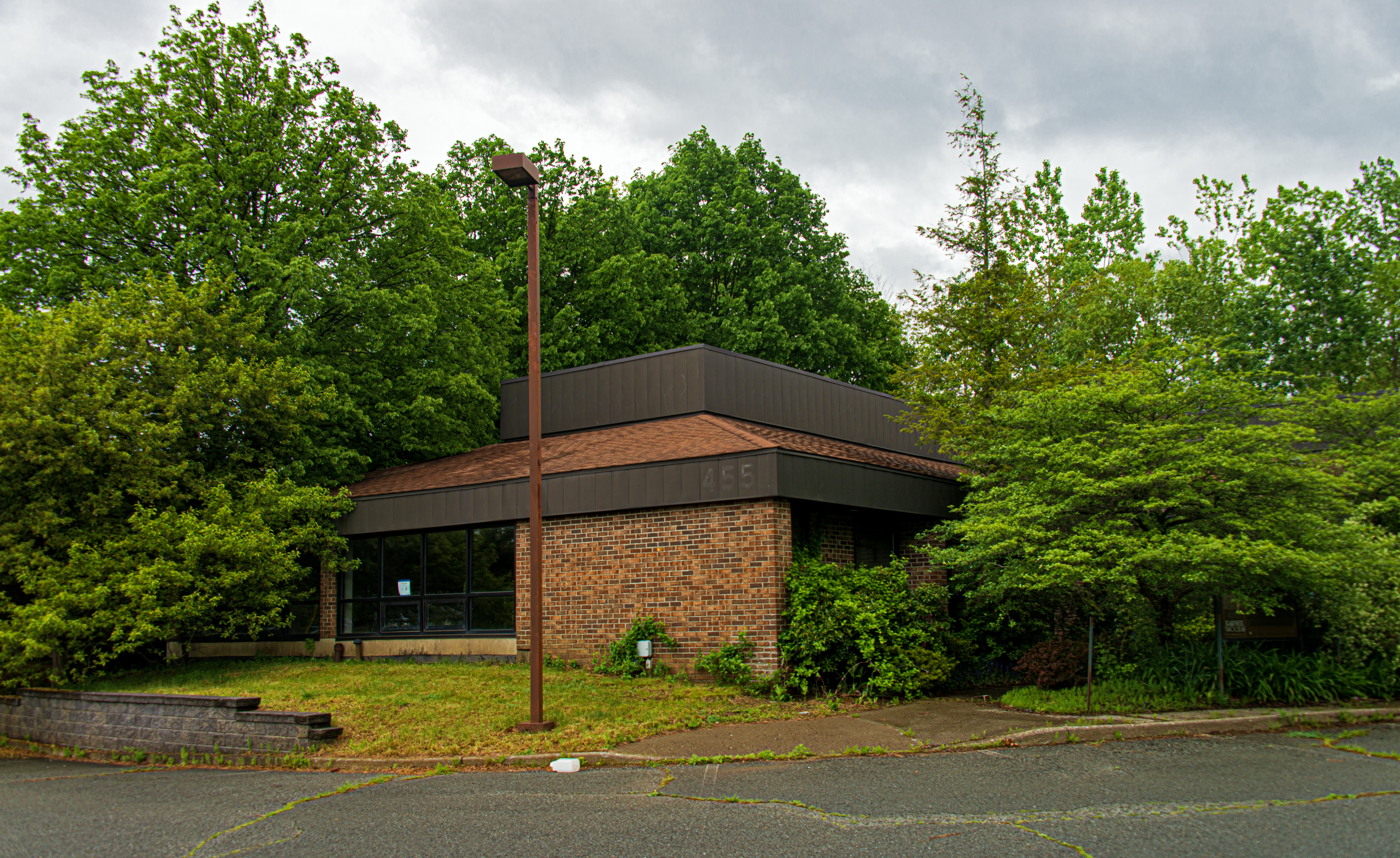
- NXIVM's former headquarters in Colonie, New York
- Type: Privately held company
- Industry: Self-improvement seminars
- Founded: July 20, 1998; 28 years ago
- Founder: Keith Raniere; Nancy Salzman
- Defunct: September 7, 2021; 5 years ago
- Headquarters: Colonie, New York, U.S.
- Key people: Keith Raniere (co-founder, leader); Nancy Salzman (co-founder, president); Allison Mack (recruiter, leader); Clare Bronfman (funder, leader); Emiliano Salinas (Mexican venture capitalist, son of Carlos Salinas de Gortari, former President of Mexico)
- Products: Personal-growth seminars
- Website: nxivm.com (Archived)

NXIVM (/ˈnɛksiəm/ NEK-see-əm) was a cult led by Keith Raniere, who is a convicted racketeer and sex offender. It was also the name of the defunct company that Raniere founded in 1998, which provided seminars ostensibly about human potential and served as a front organization for criminal activity by Raniere and his close associates.

NXIVM was based in the New York Capital District and had centers in the United States, Canada, and Mexico. The subsidiary companies of NXIVM engaged in recruitment based on multi-level marketing and used curricula based on teachings ("tech") of Raniere known as "Rational Inquiry". The courses attracted a variety of students, including actors and children of the rich and powerful. At its height, NXIVM had 700 active members. Alarmed by Raniere's behavior and NXIVM's practices, former members and families of NXIVM clients spoke to investigative journalists, describing the group as a cult. In 2017, ex-NXIVM members revealed damaging information about Raniere and NXIVM to The New York Times; including the existence of a NXIVM-connected secret society called "DOS" in which women were branded, made to record false confessions, and made to provide nude photographs for blackmail purposes.

Following The New York Times exposé, the United States attorney for the Eastern District of New York investigated the organization, and in 2018 brought criminal charges against Raniere and other NXIVM leaders and participants containing allegations of sex trafficking, forced labor, visa fraud, and wire fraud. All defendants except Raniere pleaded guilty. Raniere was tried in 2019. Prosecutors revealed a decades-long pattern of grooming, sexual abuse of girls and women, physical and psychological punishments against dissenters, and hacking and vexatious litigation against enemies.

On June 19, 2019, Raniere was convicted of racketeering and racketeering conspiracy as well as several other charges and was sentenced to 120 years' imprisonment. Following Raniere's conviction, the Department of Justice seized ownership of NXIVM-related entities and their intellectual property through asset forfeiture. Defendants Clare Bronfman, Nancy Salzman, and Allison Mack were given lesser prison sentences, and defendants Lauren Salzman and Kathy Russell were each given non-prison sentences. Since Raniere's conviction, he has continued to direct a small set of loyal members from his prison cell, encouraging continued recruitment.

== History ==
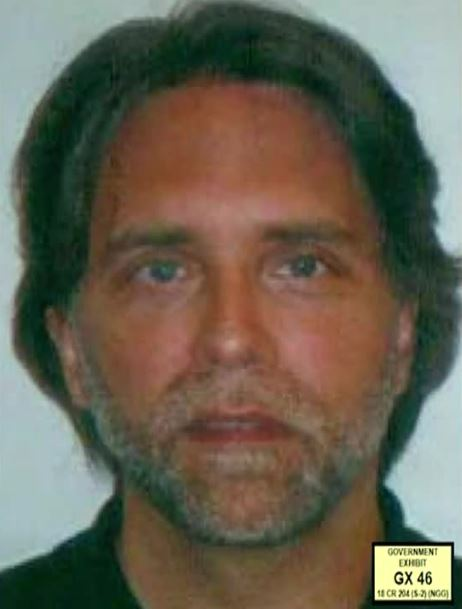
NXIVM founder Keith Raniere

Before founding NXIVM, Raniere created Consumers Buyline, a business venture that the New York Attorney General accused of having been a pyramid scheme; Raniere signed a consent order in 1996 in which he denied any wrongdoing but agreed to pay a $40,000 fine and to be permanently banned from "promoting, offering or granting participation in a chain distribution scheme".

=== Founding and initial success ===
In 1998, Raniere and Nancy Salzman founded NXIVM, a personal development company offering "Executive Success Programs" (ESP) and a range of techniques for self-improvement. Raniere claimed that its "main emphasis is to have people experience more joy in their lives". In one account cited by former NXIVM member Sarah Edmondson, Raniere chose the name based on the ancient Roman system of debt bondage known as nexum. The 2002 registration with United States Patent and Trademark Office for the NXIVM trademark states that "The foreign wording in the mark translates into English as 'the next millennium'".

During NXIVM seminars, students would call Raniere and Salzman "Vanguard" and "Prefect", respectively. The Hollywood Reporter wrote that Raniere adopted the title from the 1981 video game Vanguard, "in which the destruction of one's enemies increased one's own power". Within the organization, the reasoning for the titles was that Raniere was the leader of a philosophical movement and Salzman was his first student.

By 2003, 3,700 people had taken part in ESP classes. Reported participants included businesswoman Sheila Johnson, former Surgeon General Antonia Novello, Enron executive Stephen Cooper, Ana Cristina Fox (daughter of former Mexican president Vicente Fox), entrepreneur Richard Branson (who denied having taken the classes), businessman Edgar Bronfman Sr., and actresses Linda Evans, Grace Park, and Nicki Clyne. In the early 2000s, Seagram heiresses Clare and Sara Bronfman, daughters of Edgar Bronfman Sr., became attached to the organization.

==== Cult allegations in early 2000s ====
NXIVM claimed its training was a trade secret, subject to non-disclosure agreements, but reportedly used a technique the organization called "rational inquiry" to facilitate personal and professional development. In 2003, NXIVM sued the Ross Institute in the case known as NXIVM Corp. v. Ross Institute, alleging copyright infringement for publishing excerpts of content from its manual in three critical articles commissioned by cult investigator Rick Alan Ross and posted on his website. Ross posted a psychiatrist's assessment of NXIVM's "secret" manual on his website that called the regimen "expensive brainwashing".

Ross obtained the manual from former member Stephanie Franco, a co-defendant in the trial, who had signed a non-disclosure agreement not to divulge information from the manual to others. NXIVM filed suits in New York and New Jersey, but both were dismissed. On appeal, the United States Court of Appeals for the Second Circuit affirmed the dismissal, ruling that the defendant's critical analysis was fair use since the secondary use was transformative as criticism and was not a potential replacement for the original on the market.

In October 2003, Forbes published a critical article on NXIVM and Raniere. According to Vanity Fair, NXIVM leadership, who had spoken to Forbes, had expected a positive story. They were especially upset by remarks made by Edgar Bronfman Sr., who told Forbes that he believed NXIVM was a cult and that he was troubled by his daughters' "emotional and financial investment" in it. In 2006, Forbes published an article about the Bronfman sisters, stating that they had taken out a line of credit to loan NXIVM $2 million, repayable through personal training sessions and phone consultations with Salzman. Another Forbes article in 2010 discussed the failures of commodities and real estate deals by the Bronfmans made on Raniere's advice.

==== Recruitment in Vancouver ====
After actress Kristin Kreuk became involved with NXIVM in 2006, Salzman and her daughter Lauren, a junior NXIVM leader, went to Vancouver to recruit Kreuk's Smallville co-star Allison Mack. Lauren bonded with Mack (the two women eventually became Raniere's inner circle and his sexual partners). Kreuk, however, left NXIVM in 2013. Mack became "an enthusiastic proselytizer" for NXIVM, persuading her parents to take courses, and after wrapping production of Smallville in 2011, moved to Clifton Park, New York, to be near NXIVM's home base in Albany.

==== 2008–2010 ====
In 2008, the Bronfman sisters allegedly pressured Stephen Herbits, a confidant of their father, to ask Albany County District Attorney David Soares, New York Governor Eliot Spitzer, and New Jersey Attorney General Anne Milgram to begin criminal investigations into NXIVM's critics. NXIVM reportedly kept dossiers on Soares, Spitzer, political consultants Roger Stone and Steve Pigeon, U.S. Senator Chuck Schumer, and Albany Times Union publisher George Randolph Hearst III in a box in the basement of Nancy Salzman's home. According to the Times Union, NXIVM "developed a reputation for aggressively pursuing critics and defectors who broke from its ranks, including using litigation to punish critics of Raniere, the organization, or its training methods."

The World Ethical Foundations Consortium, an organization co-founded by Raniere and the Bronfman sisters, sponsored a visit to Albany by the Dalai Lama in 2009. The visit was initially canceled by the Dalai Lama owing to negative press about NXIVM, but was rescheduled; the Dalai Lama spoke at the Hart Theater at the Egg in Albany in May 2009. The Bronfman sisters announced at the talk that they were broke and could not pay him. He said that he gives talks to spread dharma, not for money. In 2017, Lama Tenzin Dhonden, the self-styled "Personal Emissary for Peace for the Dalai Lama" who had arranged the appearance, was suspended from his position amid corruption charges; the investigation also revealed a personal relationship between Dhonden and Sara Bronfman, which began in 2009.

NXIVM has been described as a pyramid scheme, a sex-trafficking operation, a cult, and a sex cult. In a 2010 Times Union article, former NXIVM coaches characterized students as "prey" for Raniere's sexual or gambling-related proclivities. Kristin Keeffe, a longtime partner of Raniere and mother of his child, left the group in 2014 and called Raniere "dangerous", saying, "All the worst things you know about NXIVM are true."

==== Related organizations ====
NXIVM has been associated with several related organizations. Jness was a society aimed at women, while the Society of Protectors was aimed primarily at men. A third group was known by the acronym DOS, short for "Dominus Obsequious Sororium", which, according to one member, means "master over slave women". In 2006, Raniere founded Rainbow Cultural Garden, an international chain of childcare organizations in which children were to be exposed to seven different languages.

In 2014, Raniere founded the NXIVM-affiliated news organization The Knife of Aristotle, to identify and measure media bias.

=== Exposure of "DOS" and NXIVM downfall ===
Starting with reports by Frank Parlato in June 2017 and bolstered by an October 2017 article in The New York Times, details began to emerge about "DOS", a secret society of women that started in 2015 within NXIVM in which female members were allegedly called slaves, branded with the initials of Raniere and Mack, subjected to corporal punishment from their "masters", and required to provide nude photos or other potentially damaging information about themselves as "collateral". Law enforcement representatives have alleged that DOS members were forced into sexual slavery.

==== Whistleblowers' accounts ====
Sarah Edmondson, a Canadian actress who had been an ESP participant since 2005, said that she left NXIVM after Mack inducted her into DOS at her Albany home. Edmondson alleged that DOS participants were blindfolded naked, held down by Mack and three other women, and branded on the lower abdomen with a cauterizing pen by NXIVM-affiliated doctor Danielle Roberts. Appearing on an A&E television program about cults, Edmondson provided additional context for the use of the "collateral" concept, saying that it was used in innocuous forms from the earliest, outermost stages of NXIVM in order to acclimate victims—for example, collateralizing small amounts of money that one might forfeit if one did not go to the gym one day. The New York Times later reported that hundreds of members left NXIVM after Edmondson went public about her experience.

On December 15, 2017, the ABC newsmagazine 20/20 aired an exposé including interviews with many former NXIVM adherents, including Edmondson and Catherine Oxenberg, who alleged that her daughter, India Oxenberg, was in danger from the group. Several former members reported financial and sexual predation by NXIVM leaders. Edmondson further appeared in "Escaping NXIVM", during the first season of the CBC podcast Uncover.

Seven socially prominent Mexican citizens, including Emiliano Salinas (son of former president Carlos Salinas de Gortari) and Ana Cristina Fox (daughter of former president Vicente Fox), Rosa Laura Junco, Loreta Garza Dávila (a business leader from Nuevo Leon), Daniela Padilla, and Mónica Durán, have been accused of involvement.

==== Arrest of Raniere ====
United States. v. Raniere, et al. Superseding indictment #1, filed July 23, 2018.

In March 2018, Raniere was arrested and indicted on charges related to DOS, including sex trafficking, sex trafficking conspiracy, and conspiracy to commit forced labor. He was arrested in Mexico and held in custody in New York after appearing in federal court in Fort Worth, Texas. The indictment alleged that at least one woman was coerced into sex with Raniere, who forced DOS members to undergo the branding ritual alleged by Edmondson and others. United States Attorney Richard Donoghue stated that Raniere "created a secret society of women whom he had sex with and branded with his initials, coercing them with the threat of releasing their highly personal information and taking their assets".

==== Indictment of Raniere and co-conspirators ====
On April 20, 2018, Mack was arrested and indicted on similar charges to Raniere's. According to prosecutors, after she recruited women into first NXIVM and then DOS, Mack was allegedly paid by Raniere to coerce them into engaging in sexual activity with Raniere. Mack was further alleged to be DOS's second-in-command after Raniere. On April 24, Mack was released on $5 million bond pending trial and held under house arrest with her parents in California. On May 4, Raniere pleaded not guilty.

Salzman's home was raided shortly after Raniere's arrest, and prosecutors stated during his arraignment that further arrests and a superseding indictment for Raniere and Mack should be expected. In late May, authorities moved to seize two NXIVM-owned properties near Albany.

In April 2018, the New York Post reported that NXIVM had moved to Brooklyn, New York, and was being led by Clare Bronfman. On June 12, 2018, the Times Union reported that NXIVM had suspended its operations owing to "extraordinary circumstances facing the company". Bronfman was arrested on July 24 and charged with racketeering. She was released to house arrest after signing a $100 million bail bond. Also arrested and charged with the same crime were NXIVM President Nancy Salzman; her daughter, Lauren Salzman; and another NXIVM employee, Kathy Russell.

==== Guilty pleas, corporations and conviction ====
On March 13, 2019, Nancy Salzman pleaded guilty to a charge of racketeering criminal conspiracy.

The same day as Nancy Salzman's plea, the court unsealed a second (and final) superseding indictment against Raniere and his codefendants, adding the charge that Raniere produced and kept child sexual abuse material of a girl who was 15 at the time.

Later in March 2019, Lauren Salzman pleaded guilty to racketeering and racketeering conspiracy; she later testified against Raniere and received leniency.

Sentencing documents for Allison Mack state that she entered proffer sessions on April 2, 2019. The government credited her for providing relevant emails, documents and recordings later used to convict Raniere. On April 8, 2019, Mack pleaded guilty to racketeering and racketeering conspiracy. Though not called to testify against Keith Raniere, prosecutors said that Mack, "was available to testify at Raniere’s trial if requested to do so."

On April 19, 2019, Bronfman pleaded guilty to charges of harboring an illegal immigrant and identity fraud; bookkeeper Kathy Russell pleaded guilty to visa fraud.

The federal trial of Keith Raniere began on May 7, 2019. On June 19, 2019, the jury convicted him of all counts.

Persons convicted in the NXIVM racketeering case
Name	Charges	Sentence	Status (as of July 2026)
Keith Raniere	Found guilty at jury trial of all charges including: Count 1: Racketeering Conspiracy; Count 2: Racketeering for the predicate racketeering acts (all marked by jury foreperson as "Proven"); Act 1: Conspiracy to Commit Identity Theft, Conspiracy to Unlawfully Possess an Identification Document; Act 2, 3: Sexual Exploitation of a Child (separate acts against the same victim); Act 4: Possession of Child Pornography; Act 5: Conspiracy to Commit Identity Theft; Identity Theft (two separate victims); Act 6: Conspiracy to Alter Records for Use in an Official Proceeding; Act 7: Conspiracy to Commit Identity Theft; Act 8: Trafficking for Labor and Services; Document Servitude; Act 9: Extortion; Act 10: Sex Trafficking; Forced Labor; Act 11: Conspiracy to Commit Identity Theft; Count 3: Forced Labor Conspiracy; Count 4: Wire Fraud Conspiracy; Count 5: Sex Trafficking Conspiracy; Count 6: Sex Trafficking; Count 7: Attempted Sex Trafficking	Judge Nicholas Garaufis entered October 27, 2020, included: 120 years imprisonment; $1.75 million in fines due to the United States Government; $15,000 assessment pursuant to the Justice for Victims of Trafficking Act of 2015; From a supplemental sentencing statement & order, filed July 20, 2021, by Judge Garaufis: Monetary restitution from Raniere of $3.46 million to twenty-one victims; Seventeen victims recognized under the Trafficking Victims Protection Act (TVPA); Four victims compensated under Mandatory Victims Restitution Act (MVRA); "All lower-ranking members of DOS are victims of the wire fraud conspiracy in which the Defendant participated. […] Accordingly, the court finds that all lower-ranking DOS members are statutorily entitled to the return of their collateral, and it orders Mr. Raniere to effectuate that return to the fullest extent practicable."; Due to Fifth Amendment concerns, Garaufis stayed this order while Raniere's direct appeal is heard before the United States Court of Appeals for the Second Circuit.	Previously incarcerated at Tucson USP, now located at FCI Butner in North Carolina.
Allison Mack	Pleaded guilty to racketeering and racketeering conspiracy	3 years in prison	Released on July 3, 2023
Clare Bronfman	Pleaded guilty to conspiring to conceal and harbor an undocumented immigrant for financial gain, and fraudulent use of identification	81 months in prison	Previously incarcerated at Danbury FCI, now in RRM New York
Lauren Salzman	Pleaded guilty to racketeering and racketeering conspiracy	5 years of probation	
Nancy Salzman	Pleaded guilty to racketeering conspiracy	42 months in prison	Released on March 19, 2024
Kathy Russell	Pleaded guilty to visa fraud	2 years of probation	

=== NXIVM after Raniere's conviction ===
The assets of NXIVM were held by Nancy Salzman, including several corporate entities and titles to intellectual property. As part of her plea agreement with the government, Salzman did not contest asset forfeiture.

Following the conviction of Keith Raniere, members of the defunct organization split, with many speaking out against Raniere and the organization. A small number of NXIVM members continue to support Raniere and protest his innocence. Attorneys for Raniere submitted letters from 56 supporters requesting leniency for Raniere.

==== Civil lawsuit against NXIVM leadership ====
In January 2020, Sarah Edmondson became lead plaintiff in a Racketeer Influenced and Corrupt Organizations Act civil suit filed in United States District Court for the Eastern District of New York accusing Raniere and 14 associates (including Nancy Salzman, Clare Bronfman, Sara Bronfman, Lauren Salzman, Allison Mack, Kathy Russell, Karen Unterreiner, Brandon Porter, Danielle Roberts, and Nicki Clyne) of conducting illegal psychological experiments on members of the company and abusing them physically, emotionally and financially.

==== Raniere and loyalists activities ====
In summer 2020, with the COVID-19 pandemic preventing in-person visitation to the Metropolitan Detention Center, Brooklyn, Raniere's remaining followers, including actress Nicki Clyne, began assembling to dance near the jail. Though they initially claimed to be entertaining all of the detainees, they were seen with a sign addressed to "Kay Rose," a name sharing Raniere's initials. The group began calling itself "The Forgotten Ones" and "We Are As You." Former NXIVM member turned prosecution witness Mark Vicente dismissed the group as a "cover movement" to support Raniere.

While incarcerated, Raniere has maintained his leadership role over NXIVM, regularly communicating with his followers by phone and through TRULINCS email. A July 16, 2020, intelligence analysis memorandum from the Federal Bureau of Prisons' Counter Terrorism Unit states that Raniere instructed his follower Suneel Chakravorty to get more women to dance "erotically" outside of the MDC. In response, authorities at the MDC moved Raniere to another unit to keep the dancers out of his line of sight. A frustrated Raniere instructed his followers to help get him moved back by ingratiating themselves to prison staff, including offering coffee and donuts as they left their shifts.

Ahead of his sentencing, prosecutors submitted a number of Raniere's communications and disciplinary issues in prison as evidence of remorselessness and that he continues to control his followers. The communications included Raniere instructing his followers to have Alan Dershowitz, the attorney who successfully negotiated a non-prosecution agreement of the late Jeffrey Epstein, speak on his behalf; Dershowitz did not comment on the matter. Prosecutors also submitted documentation that Raniere and his follower Chakravorty used a false name and "burner phone" to evade detection, with Raniere instructing Chakravorty to "get scrutiny" on Judge Nicholas Garaufis, explaining that "the judge needs to know he's being watched".

In March 2023, Clyne published a statement announcing that she would no longer defend Raniere or advocate for his release, writing that she had "come to certain realizations" that left her "no choice but to renounce the man who influenced them".

==== Sentencing and appeals for Raniere and Bronfman ====
On September 30, 2020, Judge Nicholas G. Garaufis of the United States District Court for the Eastern District of New York sentenced Clare Bronfman to six years and nine months in federal prison. The sentence was more severe than those recommended by guidelines, with Garaufis stating that, "Raniere and his adherents appear to understand Ms. Bronfman’s continued loyalty—even after his trial and conviction, during which all the details of his sexual abuse and exploitation became known to the world."

Ronald S. Sullivan Jr., attorney for Bronfman, called the sentence "an abomination." Sullivan filed notice of appeal on October 7, 2020. Bronfman only could appeal the sentence, as she forfeited the right to appeal her conviction as part of her plea.

On October 27, 2020, federal judge Nicholas Garaufis sentenced Raniere to a prison term of 120 years in prison and fined him $1.75 million. Attorneys for Keith Raniere gave notice of appeal of both his conviction and sentence on November 4, 2020.

In January 2021, Raniere was transferred from Metropolitan Detention Center, Brooklyn to begin serving his 120-year sentence. The Federal Bureau of Prisons first transferred him temporarily to United States Penitentiary, Lewisburg, a medium-security penitentiary, followed by a transfer to his permanent prison at United States Penitentiary, Tucson. The facility in Tucson, Arizona, is noted as the sole facility in the federal prison system that is both specially designated for sex offenders and also at maximum-security level.

In a hearing on restitution claims against Raniere, criminal defense attorney Marc Fernich represented Keith Raniere and stated that Bronfman had paid his fee.

Oral arguments on both Raniere and Bronfman's appeals were heard before the United States Court of Appeals for the Second Circuit on May 3, 2022. On December 9, 2022, the federal appeals court upheld the convictions and sentences for Keith Raniere and Clare Bronfman.

Bronfman initially served her sentence in Federal Detention Center, Philadelphia, and later at Federal Correctional Institution, Danbury. As of June 27, 2025, she is no longer in BOP custody.

==== Marc Elliot v. Lions Gate Entertainment libel case ====
In 2021, Raniere supporter Marc Elliot filed a lawsuit against Lions Gate Entertainment in the United States District Court for the Central District of California, alleging that he was libelled and defamed by the Starz network documentary Seduced: Inside the NXIVM Cult. Joseph Tully, the attorney who represented Elliot, also represented Raniere in his appeals. The court dismissed the lawsuit and ordered Elliot to pay Lions Gate Entertainment's attorneys' fees and costs, finding that the documentary "impl[ied] that Plaintiff was a devoted member of an organization whose leader has been implicated in a range of serious sexual crimes, but this assertion – however unflattering – is substantially true."

==== Raniere v. Garland prison case ====
In May 2022, Keith Raniere sued the U.S. Department of Justice and Bureau of Prisons, alleging violation of his civil rights. Raniere sought an injunction allowing visitation and phone calls from follower Suneel Chakravorty, who he claims is a paralegal working on his appeals. The Department of Justice, Bureau of Prisons and authorities at USP Tucson argued the injunction should be denied because Chakravorty was not a paralegal but merely "an ardent former ESP and NXIVM coach with whom [Raniere] is banned from associating."

Judge Raner Collins granted the Department of Justice's motion to dismiss the suit on grounds that Raniere failed to exhaust administrative remedies (in line with the Prison Litigation Reform Act), and his lawyer's insufficient service of process.

== Personality cult of Keith Raniere ==
NXIVM has been described as a cult and Raniere a cult leader by anti-cult activists such as Rick Alan Ross and Steven Hassan, as well as the billionaire businessman Edgar Bronfman Sr. Stephen A. Kent, a sociologist who studies new religious movements, in an article comparing NXIVM to Scientology, noted NXIVM operated mainly as a business and never incorporated as a religious organization.

=== Hagiographical claims ===
Over the decades, NXIVM emphasized Raniere's specialness through hagiography. A complaint from a 2020 lawsuit by former members of NXIVM mentioned several fantastical claims made about Raniere in NXIVM marketing materials, including claims that Raniere spoke in complete sentences as a one-year-old, mastered college-level mathematics in grade school, and was an elite athlete who won judo and track tournaments.

Raniere frequently cited having three degrees from Rensselaer Polytechnic Institute. However, he graduated with a 2.26 GPA, having failed or barely passed many of the upper-level math and science classes he bragged about.

Every August, NXIVM members would gather in Silver Bay, New York, to celebrate Raniere's birthday. Raniere's annual birthday gathering was known as "Vanguard Week", which began as a single day and eventually expanded to 11 days. The event included "tribute ceremonies" to Raniere by NXIVM members.

According to former high-ranking members of NXIVM, Raniere's word was final within NXIVM, and nothing of import happened within NXIVM without Raniere's approval. NXIVM students were taught that Raniere was the smartest and most ethical man in the world.

=== Claims of Raniere's superior intellect and sexual powers ===
Well before co-founding NXIVM, Keith Raniere made fantastical claims about his intelligence. In June 1988, the Times Union profiled Raniere, reporting on his membership in the Mega Society after he achieved a high score on founder Ronald K. Hoeflin's MEGA test, an unsupervised, 48-question test published in the April 1985 issue of Omni magazine. Although the MEGA test has been widely criticized as not having been properly validated, the 1989 edition of the Guinness Book of World Records (the last to include a category for highest IQ) described the Hoeflin Research Group as "the most exclusive ultrahigh IQ society", and the 1989 Australian edition identified Raniere, Marilyn vos Savant, and Eric Hart as the highest-scoring members of the group.

The 2003 Forbes exposé of NXIVM and Raniere showed that Raniere continued to make the claim of being the world's most intelligent man, with the addition of being "the most ethical." By the time of a 2012 Times Union article, these claims had extended to Raniere convincing some in NXIVM that "his intellectual energy sets off radar detectors."

At Raniere's trial, testimony revealed that Raniere had convinced several girls and women that sex with him could heal their purported "disintegrations," and that his semen had supernatural qualities. Raniere instructed one sexual partner to seek out a virgin because he needed a "pure vessel" for reasons "energy-related and DNA-wise."

== Beliefs and practices ==
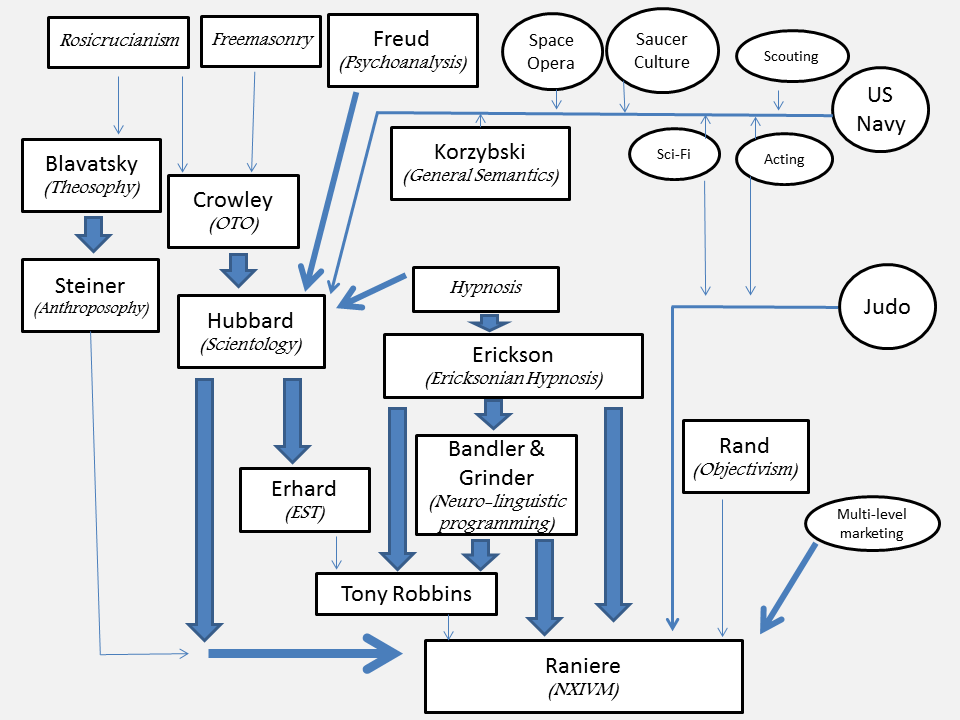
NXIVM teachings drew upon diverse influences, including Ayn Rand ("parasites"), L. Ron Hubbard ("suppressives"), Milton Erickson's hypnosis, Isaac Asimov's science fiction, Rudolf Steiner, Tony Robbins, and neuro-linguistic programming. NXIVM incorporated elements of multi-level marketing and practices from judo, with colored cloth for rank and bowing.

A 2003 mission statement on the NXIVM website read as follows:

NXIVM embodies a set of consistent and universal principles in which all humans can participate. These principles - apart from any mystical or religious notions - allow for life to persist and uphold a diversity of beliefs. By creating a new understanding, we can actualize our potential to live and work together and consequently bring human existence to a whole new level. Yet this cannot be done without first raising human awareness, fostering an ethical humanitarianism, and celebrating what it truly means to be human - and this is our mission.

In a transcript and audio of Clare Bronfman's testimony in a bankruptcy proceeding, Bronfman described the organization as a part of the Human Potential Movement.

=== Teachings ===
The oldest program of NXIVM, Executive Success Programs, had students recite a "Twelve-point Mission Statement", pledging to "purge" themselves "of all parasite and envy-based habits", to enroll others, and to "ethically control as much of the money, wealth and resources of the world as possible within my success plan." The Mission Statement also labeled students who shared Executive Success Programs materials as "breaking a promise and breaching my contract" and compromising "inner honesty and integrity."

The doctrine of the NXIVM organization, "Rational Inquiry method", was treated as Raniere's scientific invention and submitted to multiple patent offices.

NXIVM taught that some people, called "Suppressives", try to impede progress within NXIVM. People who irrevocably turned against Raniere were said to have undergone "The Fall" and were labeled, in the words of a former member, as "Luciferians, lost people for whom bad feels good, and good feels bad." Some members of NXIVM's inner circle were reportedly taught that, in past lives, they were high-ranking Nazis.

=== Classes and programs ===
NXIVM conducted "Intensives," classes conducted for 12 hours daily for 16 days. One cited price was $7,500. Classes were divided into modules. In one module, "Relationship Sourcing", students were instructed to explore the benefits they would receive in the event of a partner's sudden death. Another module, "Dracula and his ghouls", reportedly discussed psychopaths and their followers. Other module titles included "Best People; Perfect World" and "The Heroic Struggle".

=== Rituals and practices ===
Classes by NXIVM had a number of idiosyncratic practices, described within the Rational Inquiry patent as "rules and rituals" and third-party sources as including:

- Rules and rituals: Rational Inquiry prescribes students to perform a number of gestures including a handshake, bowing, and handclap. Greetings included both a common handshake and an "ESP" or "NXIVM" handshake. In the second episode of The Vow Raniere suggests these elements are intentionally strange, telling his students, "We put rules and rituals up front to be the guardian at the gate. We want some people to say 'I don't want anything to do with this.'"
- 'Stripe path: Sashes or scarves were implemented in a ranking system similar to colored belts in martial arts. The sashes or scarves came in different colors and patterns symbolizing contribution to the Executive Success mission.
- Tribute: The Rational Inquiry patent indicates that "pictures of the founders may be displayed to show respect and to give tribute." Classes ended with students expressing gratitude to Keith Raniere (as "Vanguard") and Nancy Salzman (as "Prefect").
- 'Exploration of Meaning (EM's): Described as "therapy by number", the "exploration of meaning" involved a senior member questioning participants as they delved into their childhood memories.

=== Tourette's treatment claims ===
A 2018 documentary film directed by Alessandro Molatore showcases a purported study of the use of NXIVM's exploration of meaning technique to treat Tourette syndrome. The film is executive produced by Clare Bronfman. The film identifies the Tourette's study's "lead researcher" as Dr. Brandon Porter, at the time a hospitalist at St. Peter's Hospital in Albany.

In the sentencing of Clare Bronfman, prosecutors from the United States Attorney for the Eastern District of New York wrote, "the participants in this 'study' have expressed significant distress at their involvement" and offered one victim impact statement from a Tourette's study's participant that said the study "did nothing for me except ruin my self-esteem, ruin my mental health, and made me hate myself. It did not cure my Tourette’s in any way."

The purported treatment for Tourette syndrome was noted by one reporter as not having been tested in a scientific peer-reviewed setting. Another reporter reached out to NXIVM member Marc Elliot, who promotes both the purported treatment and film, and did not receive a reply. Dr. Alan Jern, Associate Professor of Psychology at Rose–Hulman Institute of Technology, wrote in Psychology Today that "[d]espite NXIVM’s obsession with being taken seriously by influential people and mainstream institutions, their penchant for secrecy and refusal to follow the norms of science means that their research was scientifically pretty worthless."

=== Human subject experimentation ===
Another purported study Porter conducted within the NXIVM community was described as watching disturbing footage, including video of people being murdered, while their brainwaves, physiological activity, and facial and auditory responses were recorded through electroencephalography, galvanic skin response and video recording.

The purported study is similar to a patent Raniere filed, "Determination of whether a luciferian can be rehabilitated":

One example of a test to determine whether a person is a Luciferian comprises a video clip of an ice skater performing in a competition. Everything goes flawlessly until, at the very end, a mistake is made during a jump and the skater falls to the ice—all hope of winning the event is gone. A Luciferian will experience pleasure and satisfaction from this. Accordingly, the Luciferian's neurophysiological processes will register pleasure over the skater's misfortune which may be identified and quantified using the medical instrumentation. On the other hand, a non-Luciferian will feel sympathetic and empathize with the unfortunate skater. Unlike the Luciferian, a non-Luciferian's neurophysiological processes will not register as pleasure for this stimulus.

Several subjects complained to the New York State Board of the Office of Professional Medical Conduct about the experiments. Porter faced 24 professional conduct charges, including "moral unfitness to practice medicine". In August 2019, the New York State Department of Health suspended Porter's license to practice medicine in the state, finding that he conducted studies without an appropriate human research review committee.

== Notable participants ==
- Edgar Boone, the scion of a wealthy family, introduced NXIVM to numerous affluent Mexicans, becoming head of NXIVM-Mexico and rising to third in the NXIVM organization.

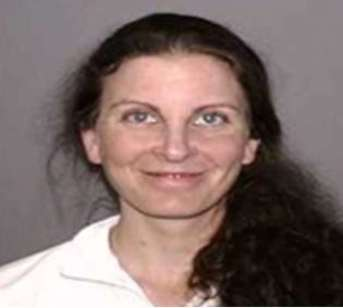
Clare Bronfman

- Clare Bronfman, daughter of billionaire Seagrams chairman Edgar Bronfman Sr., was introduced to NXIVM by her sister Sara. Clare Bronfman was arrested by federal agents on July 24, 2018, in New York City and charged with money laundering and identity theft in connection with NXIVM activities. She pleaded not guilty in the United States District Court for the Eastern District of New York in Brooklyn. She was released on $100 million bond and placed on house arrest with electronic monitoring. On April 19, 2019, Clare Bronfman pleaded guilty to conspiracy to conceal and harbor illegal immigrants for financial gain and fraudulent use of identification; she faced 21 to 27 months in prison and agreed to forfeit $6 million. On September 30, 2020, she was sentenced to six years, nine months in prison by a federal judge.
- Sara Bronfman, daughter of Edgar Bronfman Sr., was introduced to NXIVM by a family friend in 2002.
- Pam Cafritz, daughter of Washington, D.C., socialites Buffy and William Cafritz. Cafritz was a founder of JNESS, a Raniere-affiliated women's group. Cafritz was reported to be Raniere's "most important long-term girlfriend". On November 7, 2016, Pam Cafritz died. After her death, her credit card was charged for over $300,000.
- Suneel Chakravorty, a software developer, remained among Raniere's post-conviction followers, dancing outside the jail where Raniere is confined.

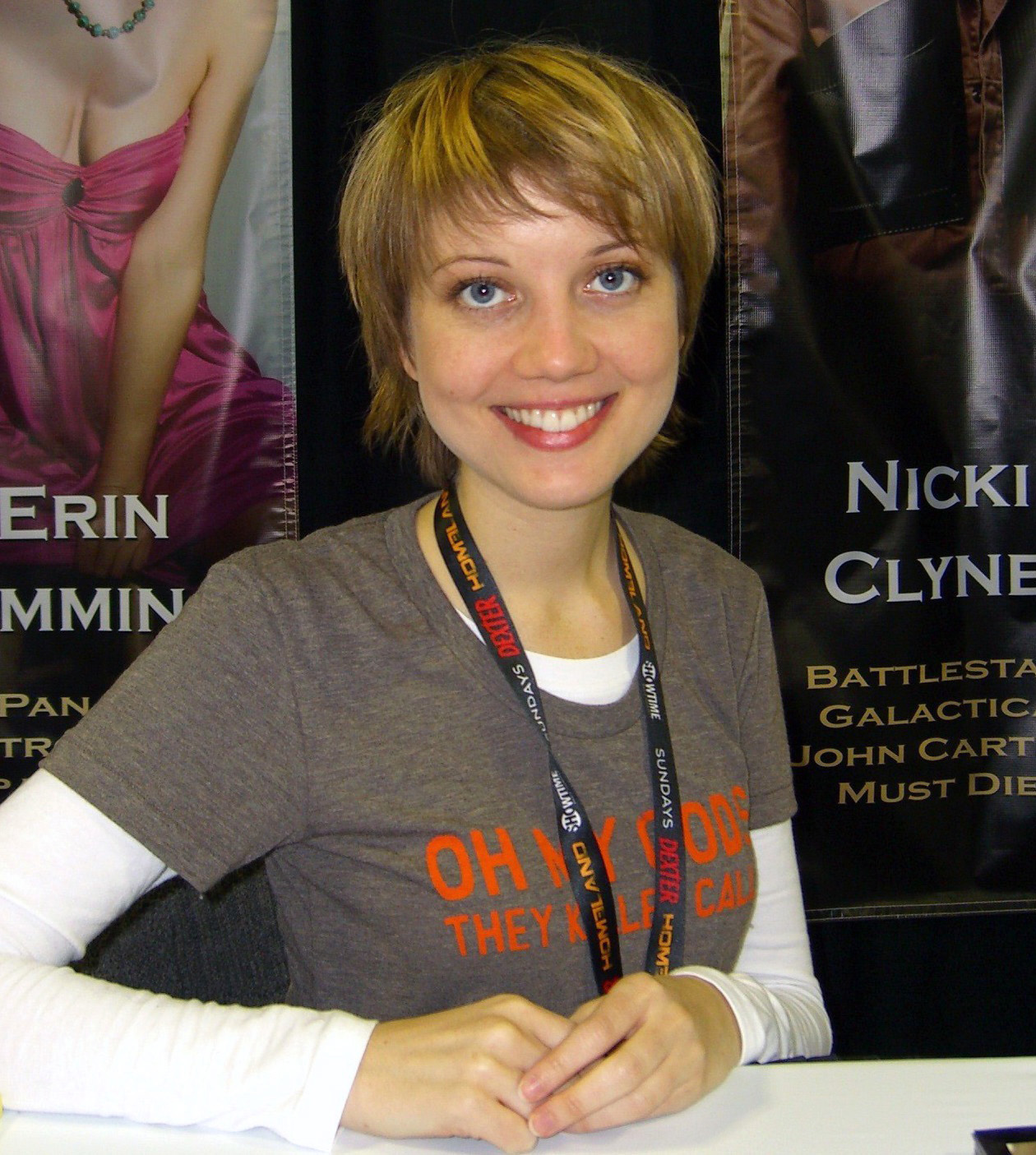
Canadian actress Nicki Clyne

- Nicki Clyne is a Canadian actress known for her role on the series Battlestar Galactica. According to reports, in 2006, Clyne became involved with NXIVM. She married fellow senior member Allison Mack in 2017; the marriage was alleged to have been a sham to evade United States immigration laws. After Raniere's conviction, Clyne and others began dancing nightly outside the detention center containing Raniere.
- Marc Elliot, an author, claims taking courses through NXIVM and working with Keith Raniere and Nancy Salzman have helped him overcome his Tourette syndrome. He is among the NXIVM members who remain loyal to Raniere.

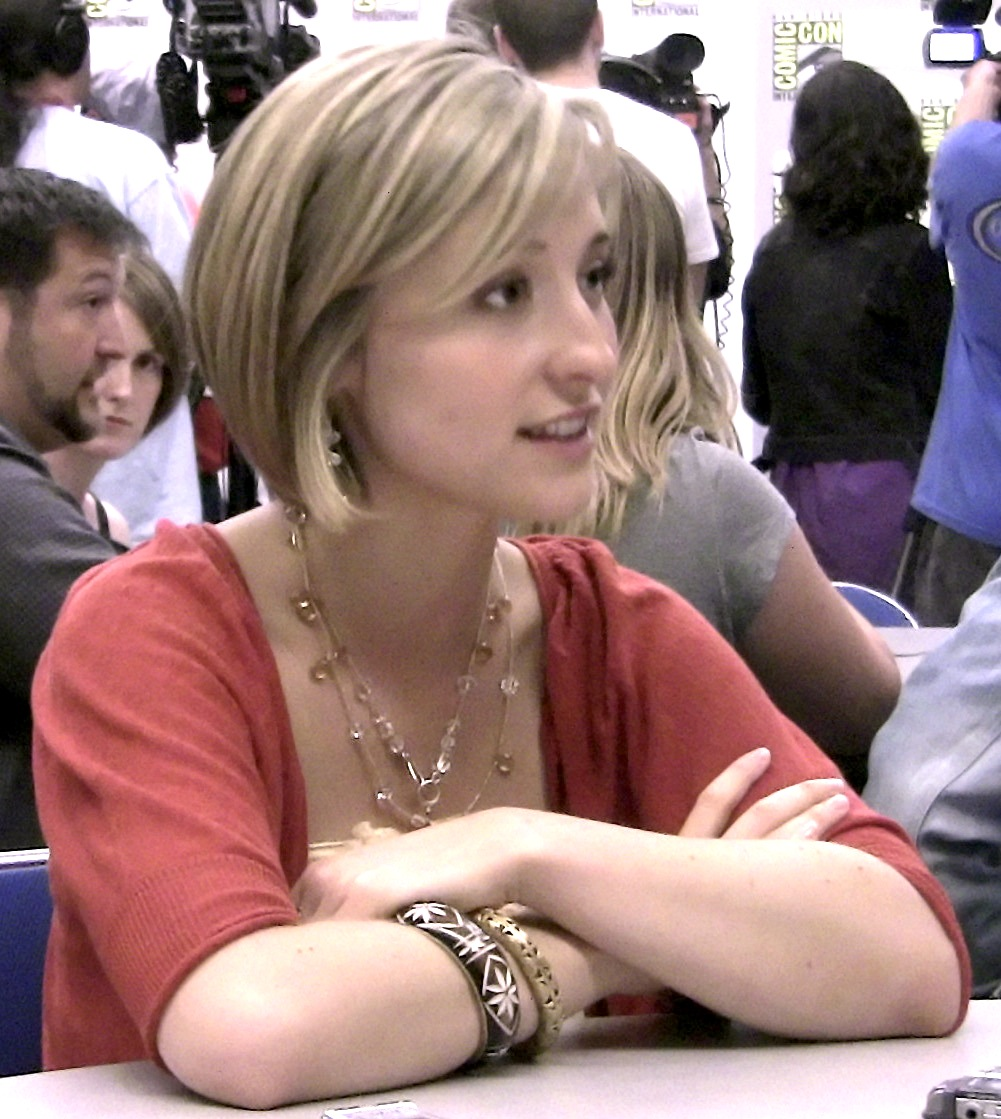
American actress Allison Mack pleaded guilty to racketeering and racketeering conspiracy charges in April 2019.

- Allison Mack is an American actress known for her role on the series Smallville. Mack was reportedly recruited to the Vancouver chapter of NXIVM, along with her Smallville co-star Kristin Kreuk. Mack was reportedly a founder of DOS, a Raniere-affiliated Master/Slave group. Mack was arrested on April 20, 2018, on charges of sex trafficking, sex trafficking conspiracy, and forced labor conspiracy. Mack pleaded guilty to racketeering and racketeering conspiracy charges in April 2019, and was to be sentenced in September 2019. However, on July 15, 2019, the Senior U.S. District Judge Nicholas Garaufis postponed the sentencing until further notice to allow federal probation officials to conduct presentencing investigations. On June 30, 2021, Mack was sentenced to three years in prison.
- Brandon Porter, a medical doctor, conducted unlicensed human-subjects research on 200 people for NXIVM. During a "fright study", Porter exposed subjects to disturbing videos, including actual footage of a decapitation. In 2016, Porter was present at a NXIVM retreat ("V-Week") where 300 to 400 individuals were struck by an unidentified disease; Porter failed to report the outbreak, in violation of his duties as a licensed medical doctor. Porter was stripped of his medical license in 2020.
- Keith Raniere, founder of NXIVM, arrested and indicted on a variety of charges related to DOS (a "secret sisterhood" within NXIVM), including sex trafficking, sex trafficking conspiracy, and conspiracy to commit forced labor in March 2018. He was found guilty of all charges at trial. On October 27, 2020, Raniere was sentenced to 120 years in prison.
- Danielle Roberts, an osteopathic physician, gained notoriety for having used a cauterizing pen to brand 17 women in connection with the group known as DOS. In 2020, New York Board of Medical Conduct began an investigation into Roberts; a year later it brought charges against her with the possibility of the revocation of her license. After Raniere's conviction, Roberts was among the dancers outside the jail in which he was incarcerated. Roberts' medical license was revoked in October 2021.
- Emiliano Salinas is a venture capitalist and businessman. He is the son of former Mexican president Carlos Salinas de Gortari. Salinas served as vice president of Prorsus Capital, a financial consortium with ties to Raniere and NXIVM.
- Nancy Salzman, a psychiatric nurse and trained practitioner of hypnotism and neuro-linguistic programming, met Raniere in 1998. The two founded Executive Success Programs, a personal development company offering a range of techniques aimed at self-improvement. In March 2019, Salzman pleaded guilty to racketeering. In September 2021, Salzman was sentenced to 42 months in prison and a $150,000 fine for racketeering conspiracy.
- Karen A. Unterreiner is a member who became Raniere's live-in partner beginning in the 1980s and an early employee of his company Consumers' Buyline.

=== Critical former members ===
- Barbara Bouchey was a client of Nancy Salzman, having been referred to her in 1988. Beginning in 2000, Bouchey dated Raniere. In 2009, Bouchey and eight other women ("The NXIVM Nine") confronted Raniere with concerns about abuse within the organization. That year, Bouchey left the group and later went to law enforcement.
- Sarah Edmondson is a Canadian actress. After leaving NXIVM in early 2017, she publicly denounced the organization, claiming that she was invited into DOS, a substructure within NXIVM operated by Keith Raniere and Allison Mack, and was branded with a combination of Raniere's and Mack's initials at Mack's Albany home. Edmondson showed the brand in a New York Times exposé of NXIVM.
- Kristin Keeffe became Raniere's partner in the early 1990s. In 2013, Keeffe gave birth to Raniere's son Gaelyn. In February 2014, Keeffe broke with Raniere and his group. Fleeing the region with her son, an email bearing Keeffe's name explained: "I have full sole legal custody of Gaelyn. Keith was experimenting on him. I had to get Gaelyn away." Keeffe publicly described Raniere as "dangerous". In 2015, Keeffe alleged that NXIVM leaders had planned to lure critics to Mexico with an invitation to an anti-cult conference; once in Mexico, the critics were to be arrested on false charges by order of a judge who had been bribed.
- Toni Natalie met Raniere in 1991 when he was pitching his business Consumer's Buyline. Natalie and her then-husband became top sellers for the organization. Natalie recalled that she was able to stop smoking after a two-hour session with Raniere. Natalie and her son later moved to be near Raniere; her marriage ended shortly thereafter. Natalie and Raniere dated for the next eight years. In the mid-90s, Raniere and Natalie operated a health-food store in Clifton Park, NY. In 1999, Raniere's eight-year relationship with Natalie ended. Natalie would subsequently claim to have been the victim of harassment. In a January 2003 ruling, federal judge Robert Littlefield implied Raniere was using a legal suit to harass Natalie. Wrote Littlefield: "This matter smacks of a jilted fellow's attempt at revenge or retaliation against his former girlfriend, with many attempts at tripping her up along the way." In 2011, Natalie filed documents in federal court alleging that she had been repeatedly raped by Raniere.
- Joseph J. O'Hara was an attorney who departed NXIVM in 2005 after accusing the group of misdeeds. In 2007, O'Hara was indicted by Albany County. It was later revealed that the District Attorney had allowed Raniere's girlfriend Kristin Keeffe to operate within its office as a sort of victims' advocate. Charges were ultimately dismissed.
- India Oxenberg, daughter of actress Catherine Oxenberg, was introduced to the group in 2011. At Raniere's trial, a witness testified that India had spent a year on a 500-calorie-per-day diet. In May 2017, India admitted to her mother that she was among those who had been branded. India left the group in June 2018, after Raniere's arrest. In August 2018, Catherine Oxenberg's book Captive: A Mother's Crusade to Save Her Daughter from a Terrifying Cult was published.
- Mark Vicente, a filmmaker known for the 2004 film What the Bleep Do We Know!?, began involvement with the group in 2005. Vicente testified against Raniere at his 2019 trial. His wife Bonnie Piesse, an actress best known for her role as the young Beru Lars in the Star Wars franchise, was also a member before she left the group in 2017, the same year in which Vicente would leave. The two became two of NXIVM's fiercest critics.

=== Other persons ===
- Richard Branson, a British billionaire businessmen, is said to have attended the group's seminars, which Branson denied. Raniere tried to recruit Branson for the organization and NXIVM is said to have repeatedly held seminars and “wild parties” on Branson's private island, Necker Island. Branson later denied having known about this and having ever known Raniere.
- Roger Stone, a lobbyist and longtime adviser of Donald Trump, was a lobbyist for NXIVM but was not a member. He said that he "never saw any evidence that NXIVM was a sex cult."

== Journalists reporting on the group ==
- James Odato is an investigative reporter who wrote for the Albany Times Union. In 2012, Odato reported Raniere's history of pedophilia. In October 2013, Odato was named in a lawsuit filed by NXIVM, along with Suzanna Andrews of Vanity Fair and blogger John J. Tighe; all had written critically of the group. The suit alleged that NXIVM computers had been illegally accessed. Shortly thereafter, Odato was described as being "on leave" from the Times Union. Following Keith Raniere's sentencing in 2020, the editorial board of the New York Daily News praised Odato's work exposing NXIVM for its prescience, taking the unusual step of commending the work published by a competitor.
- Frank Parlato was hired by NXIVM in 2007 to help with publicity. After concluding that NXIVM members were being defrauded by Raniere, Parlato began blogging about the group on his sites ArtVoice, The Niagara Falls Reporter, and The Frank Report.
- Rick Alan Ross is the executive director of the Ross Institute, which specializes in studying cults. Ross received a copy of a NXIVM training manual and published portions of it on his website. In NXIVM Corp. v. Ross Institute, NXIVM sued to try to block further publications. Courts ruled in favor of Ross.
- John Tighe wrote about NXIVM on a blog. In 2013, NXIVM accused Tighe of illegally accessing NXIVM servers using a former member's login information. Tighe's home was raided by the New York State Police, and his computer was seized.

== Films, documentaries and books ==
=== Documentaries ===
- A&E Investigates: Cults and Extreme Belief aired its premier 1 hour episode, "NXIVM", featuring interviews of former members Sarah Edmondson and Mark Vicente, on May 28, 2018.
- A&E presents: Escaping The NXIVM Cult: A Mother's Fight To Save Her Daughter (air date was September 21, 2019)
- Investigation Discovery released a two-hour special, The Lost Women of NXIVM on June 20, 2019.
- HBO released a docuseries about NXIVM titled The Vow; it premiered on August 23, 2020.
- Starz released a docuseries about NXIVM titled Seduced: Inside the NXIVM Cult; it premiered on October 18, 2020.
- NXIVM was the subject on an episode E! True Hollywood Story comprising interviews from several journalists and the people that were once involved with the organization including Catherine Oxenberg, Sarah Edmondson, and actor and Oxenberg's real-life friend Callum Blue.
- CNBC aired an episode of American Greed titled "Nightmare at NXIVM" on January 25, 2021.
- NBC aired a Dateline special on February 26, 2021, featuring an interview with Keith Raniere.
- NXIVM appears in an episode of the second season of How To with John Wilson titled "How To Appreciate Wine", when Wilson recalls encountering Keith Raniere while in a college a capella group. The episode aired on HBO on December 3, 2021.

=== Books ===
- Oxenberg, Catherine; Stoynoff, Natasha (August 7, 2018). Captive: A Mother's Crusade to Save Her Daughter from a Terrifying Cult. Simon and Schuster. ISBN 978-1982100650.
- Edmondson, Sarah; Gasbarre, Kristine (September 17, 2019). Scarred: The True Story of How I Escaped NXIVM, the Cult That Bound My Life. Chronicle Prism. ISBN 978-1452184265.
- Natalie, Toni (September 24, 2019). The Program: Inside the Mind of Keith Raniere and the Rise and Fall of NXIVM. Grand Central Publishing. ISBN 978-1538701065.
- Berman, Sarah (April 20, 2021). Don't Call it a Cult: The Shocking Story of Keith Raniere and the Women of NXIVM. Steerforth. ISBN 978-1586422752.
- Joan, Jessica; Johnson, Brian (September 11, 2021). The Untouchable Jessica Joan: A Real Life Journey Of Love, Forgiveness, And Evolution From The Jane Doe Who Helped Bring The NXIVM Cult To Justice. Live Your Dreams Out Loud Publishing. ISBN 978-1734897425.

=== Other ===
- The first season of the Canadian Broadcasting Corporation's investigative podcast series Uncover, was about the cult and was released in 2018.
- NBC aired Law & Order: Special Victims Unit Season 20, Episode 5 entitled “Accredo” based on the details of this cult. The episode aired October 18, 2018.
- Catherine Oxenberg produced a film for Lifetime about her daughter's experiences with NXIVM. It is titled Escaping the NXIVM Cult: A Mother's Fight to Save Her Daughter and aired on September 21, 2019. While Catherine Oxenberg served as the narrator and executive producer, the film starred Andrea Roth as Catherine Oxenberg, Peter Facinelli as Keith Raniere, and Sara Fletcher as Allison Mack.
- India Oxenberg wrote and narrated an audio book memoir, Still Learning, about her time in, and escape from, NXIVM.
- The BBC World Service program Outlook aired a four-part series on NXIVM in May and June 2021.
- Canadian Broadcasting Corporation's investigative podcast series Uncover, published "Allison after NXIVM" which was released in 2026.
