= NXIVM Corp. v. Ross Institute =

2004 US Federal Court of Appeals decision

NXIVM Corp. v. The Ross Institute
- Court: United States Court of Appeals for the Second Circuit
- Full case name: NXIVM Corporation and First Principles, Inc. v. The Ross Institute, et al.
- Argued: November 19 2003
- Decided: April 20 2004
- Citations: 364 F.3d 471, 70 U.S.P.Q.2d 1538

Case history
- Prior history: Preliminary injunction denied (United States District Court for the Northern District of New York 2003). Appealed to United States Court of Appeals for the Second Circuit
- Subsequent history: Certiorari denied (Supreme Court of the United States 2004)

Holding
- Defendants’ use of material for critical commentary was fair use despite bad faith on the part of the defendants in obtaining the material.

Court membership
- Judges sitting: Chief Judge John M. Walker, Jr.; Circuit Judges Dennis Jacobs and Chester J. Straub

Case opinions
- Majority: Walker, joined by Jacobs
- Concurrence: Jacobs

Laws applied
- 17 U.S.C. § 107

NXIVM Corp. v. The Ross Institute, 364 F.3d 471 (2d Cir. 2004), was a United States Court of Appeals for the Second Circuit decision that held that the defendant's critical analysis of material obtained in bad faith, i.e., in violation of a non-disclosure agreement, was fair use since the secondary use was transformative as criticism and was not a potential replacement for the original on the market, regardless of how the material was obtained.

NXIVM, pronounced NEX-ee-um, was a sex trafficking cult that claimed to offer a life-improvement seminar called the "Executive Success Program" (ESP). At the time of the court case, NXIVM's status as a sex trafficking cult was not widely known to the public, and would not be until key leaders were indicted in 2018. NXIVM sued the Ross Institute and several individuals for posting quotations from a NXIVM training manual on Ross Institute's website in the context of two written critiques of the manual and NXIVM's training program. NXIVM's lawyers attempted to argue that the fair use doctrine did not apply since Ross had obtained copies of the manuscript in bad faith, i.e., he obtained them from a former ESP participant who had signed a non-disclosure agreement. Both the district court and the appeals court ruled in Ross's favor. An appeals judge stated, "Certainly, no critic should need an author's permission to make such criticism, regardless of how he came by the original; nor should publication be inhibited by a publisher's anxiety or uncertainty about an author's ethics if his secondary work is transformative."

== Facts and procedural history ==
NXIVM was a sex trafficking organization that posed as a multi-level marketing company that offered a life-improvement seminar called the "Executive Success" program (ESP). ESP claimed to train participants in a method NXIVM claimed would improve communication and decision-making. As part of the ESP seminar, NXIVM provided a training manual to paying participants who signed non-disclosure agreements that they would not discuss or release the manual to non-participants.

As executive director of the nonprofit organization the Ross Institute, Rick Ross maintained two websites to provide information to the public about cults and other controversial groups that had complaints made against them for allegedly using deception and undue influence to manipulate participants. Ross received the NXIVM manual through a former ESP participant and commissioned reports from two mental health professionals who analyzed and critiqued the manual, quoting sections of it to support their analysis. The reports, which referred to the program as "expensive brainwashing", were made available to the public on Ross’s websites. About 17 of 500 pages were republished on Ross's websites in the context of the critiques.

In 2003, NXIVM filed a federal trade-secrets lawsuit against the Ross Institute, Rick Ross, the authors of the reports, and the former ESP participant who provided the manual to them, alleging copyright infringement for their use of quotations from NXIVM's "secret" manual in the online critical reports of the manual and training program, arguing that the fair use doctrine should not apply since the manual had been obtained through the violation of a nondisclosure agreement, constituting bad faith.

Finding that the reports were likely protected by the fair use doctrine, the district court denied NXIVM's motion seeking a preliminary injunction directing Ross to remove the material from his websites. NXIVM appealed the decision to the United States Court of Appeals for the Second Circuit.

== Issue ==
The issue before the Court was whether a fair use defense was available where the materials used were obtained in bad faith.

== Opinion of the court ==
The court noted that defendants’ misconduct in obtaining unauthorized material is one of several relevant factors in a fair use defense as set forth by the Supreme Court in Harper & Row v. Nation Enterprises, but that obtaining the manuscript in bad faith does not preclude a fair use defense.

The court weighed the four fair use factors to determine if Ross’s use was fair, and made the following findings:

1. The purpose and character of the use was transformative as criticism and favored the defendants even if the defendants’ bad faith in obtaining the manual favored the plaintiffs.
2. The nature of the copyrighted work was unpublished and favored the plaintiffs.
3. The amount and substantiality of the portion used in relation to the copyrighted work as a whole did not favor the plaintiffs as (1) it was reasonable for the defendants to quote liberally from the manual in order to critically comment on it and (2) there was no identifiable "heart" of the manual.
4. The market inquiry heavily favored the defendants because, "as a general matter, criticisms of a seminar or organization cannot substitute for the seminar or organization itself or hijack its market."

The court ruled in favor of the defendants and affirmed the denial of the preliminary injunction, stating,

If criticisms on defendants' websites kill the demand for plaintiffs' service, that is the price that, under the First Amendment, must be paid in the open marketplace for ideas...Certainly, no critic should need an author's permission to make such criticism, regardless of how he came by the original; nor should publication be inhibited by a publisher's anxiety or uncertainty about an author's ethics if his secondary work is transformative.

== See also ==
- Campbell v. Acuff-Rose Music, Inc.
