= Clare Bronfman =

American heiress and convicted felon

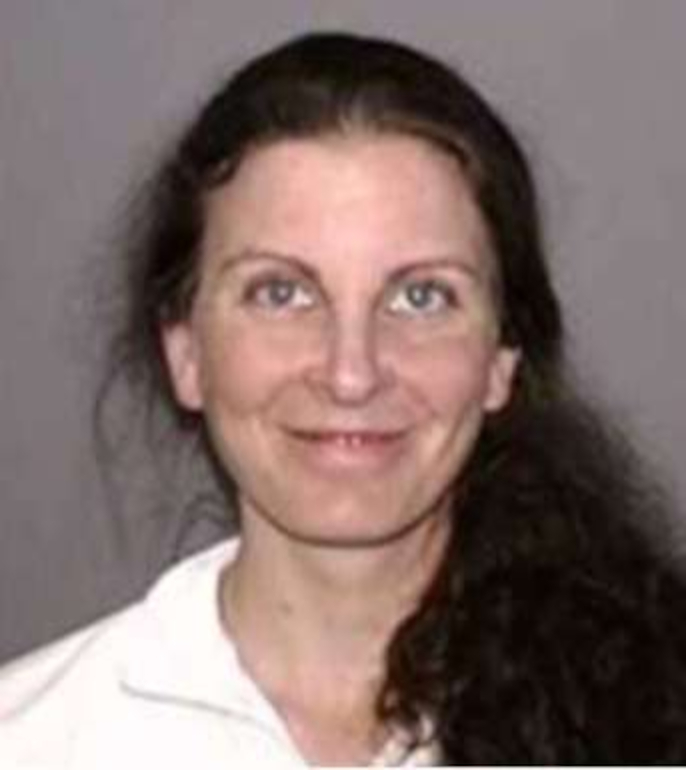
- Born: Clare Webb Bronfman; 1979 (age 46–47); New York, United States
- Organization: NXIVM
- Criminal charges: Conspiracy to conceal and harbor illegal aliens for financial gain (8 U.S.C. § 1324); Fraudulent use of identification (18 U.S.C. § 1028)
- Criminal penalty: 81 months imprisonment; 3 years supervised release with special conditions; $200 special assessment; $96,605.25 restitution; $500,000 fine; $6 million forfeiture money judgment
- Criminal status: Convicted
- Parents: Edgar Bronfman Sr; Georgiana Bronfman Havers (née Rita Webb)
- Relatives: Sara Bronfman (sister); Edgar Bronfman Jr. (half-brother); Hannah Bronfman (niece)
- Family: Bronfman family
- Website: via Internet Archive

Clare Webb Bronfman (born 1979) is an American heiress and former leader of NXIVM, a multi-level marketing company and cult based near Albany, New York. She is the youngest daughter of billionaire philanthropist and former Seagram liquor chairman Edgar Bronfman Sr. After a brief equestrian career, Bronfman began involvement in NXIVM, a business engaged in criminal activities during 1998–2018, which led to indictments on federal charges, including sex trafficking.

In April 2019, Bronfman pleaded guilty to conspiracy to conceal and harbor illegal aliens for financial gain, and to fraudulent use of identification. The prosecution requested a sentence of five years in prison. In September 2020, Judge Nicholas Garaufis sentenced Bronfman to six years and nine months imprisonment. As of June 27, 2025, she is no longer in BOP custody.

== Background ==
Bronfman is a daughter of Canadian billionaire Edgar Bronfman Sr. and Rita Webb, the daughter of an English pub owner from Essex, England. Bronfman's parents met in Marbella, Spain. The couple married in 1975, two years after Edgar Bronfman's divorce from his first wife. Webb gave birth to Sara the following year, and had Clare two and a half years later. Shortly after Clare's birth, Webb (who had renamed herself Georgiana) asked Edgar for a divorce. They remarried in 1983, but again divorced. After their parents' second divorce, the girls visited their father at his estates outside Charlottesville, Virginia, and in Westchester County; his home in Sun Valley; and his apartment on Fifth Avenue. However, they resided in England and in Kenya with their mother. Bronfman is of Jewish ancestry on her father's side.

== Equestrian career ==
In December 1999, Bronfman competed in the Millstreet Indoor International Horse Show. In May 2001, Bronfman won the Grand Prix at CSI-A Eindhoven (NED). On September 23, 2001, Bronfman's team placed seventh in the World Final of the Samsung Nations Cup Series (Jumping). On May 26, 2002, Bronfman won the Grand Prix in Rome (ITA); her team placed sixth in the competition. In October 2002, Bronfman placed 13th at the CSI-A competition in Bremen.

On October 1, 2018, after her involvement with the NXIVM group came to light, Bronfman was permanently banned by the United States Center for SafeSport, which investigates and issues sanctions to members of Olympic sports accused of sexual misconduct. This rendered her ineligible for any involvement with the United States Equestrian Federation (USEF), which governs horse sports in the United States.

== NXIVM involvement and criminal prosecution ==
Nxivm Indictment

Through her sister Sara, Clare Bronfman became involved in 2002 in NXIVM's personal advancement program and "Executive Success Program" ("ESP") workshops. The sisters became committed followers and financial backers of NXIVM founder Keith Raniere, relocating to upstate New York to work as NXIVM trainers. Clare Bronfman also served as event coordinator for "Vanguard Week," an annual festival celebrating Raniere's birthday, stating that "the purpose of 'V Week' is to get the chance to experience a civilized world... [and] craft for ourselves a more fulfilling, purposeful life."

=== Conflict with father ===
Clare and her sister introduced their father, billionaire Edgar Bronfman, Sr., to NXIVM. Edgar broke with the group after learning that Clare had given Raniere and Salzman a $2 million "loan" at 2.5% interest. In October 2003, Forbes magazine featured Raniere on its cover along with the title "The World's Strangest Executive Coach". The article quoted Edgar Bronfman, Sr. as stating that he thought NXIVM was "a cult". Clare Bronfman eventually became "NXIVM's operations director and one of its largest financial contributors". Raniere reportedly blamed Clare Bronfman for the bad publicity, faulting her for telling her father about the $2 million loan. Ultimately, Clare Bronfman would spend $150 million on NXIVM.

Clare Bronfman installed keylogger software on her father's computer, allowing NXIVM members to access his email for years thereafter. From 2007 to 2009, Clare Bronfman, allegedly at the direction of Raniere, employed private firms to investigate perceived enemies of the group, including six American federal judges.

=== Collaboration with the Dalai Lama ===
Eager to distance themselves from cult allegations in the press, NXIVM members sought the endorsement of the Dalai Lama, spending $2 million on the project. Clare, along with her sister Sara, and NXIVM founder Keith Raniere formed an organization called the World Ethical Foundations Consortium.

Clare and Sara were credited with being able to bring the Dalai Lama to Albany to participate in the World Ethical Foundations Consortium's inaugural event on May 6, 2009. On May 6, 2009, the Dalai Lama traveled to Albany, NXIVM's hometown, to give a talk; during the event, he presented Raniere with a khatag (the ceremonial white scarf with the symbolic meaning of "purity" in Tibetan Buddhism) onstage.

The Dalai Lama additionally wrote already in April 2009, the foreword to Ranieri's occult book entitled The Sphinx & Thelxiepeia. Eight years later, it would be revealed Clare's sister Sara had a 2009 sexual relationship with Lama Tenzin Dhonden, the Dalai Lama's gatekeeper who arranged the appearance, who as a monk had taken a vow of celibacy. Amid accusations of corruption, Dhonden was replaced.

=== Media investigations ===
In June 2017, NXIVM member Sarah Edmondson revealed the existence of a "secret sisterhood" within NXIVM to Frank Parlato, who published the story on the Frank Report. Edmondson revealed that within the secret group, female members were allegedly referred to as "slaves," branded with the initials of Raniere, subjected to corporal punishment from their "masters", and required to provide nude photos or other potentially damaging information about themselves as "collateral".

In July and September 2017, Clare Bronfman was contacted by multiple women who were part of DOS, demanding return or destruction of their collateral, but she failed to respond. In July 2017, she contacted the New York City Police Department and the Vancouver Police Department, attempting to have criminal charges filed against DOS whistleblower Sarah Edmondson. In September, she and Raniere drafted letters which were ultimately sent by attorneys in Mexico to DOS whistleblowers, threatening them with criminal prosecution.

=== Arrest and guilty plea ===
I am troubled by evidence suggesting that Ms. Bronfman repeatedly and consistently leveraged her wealth and social status as a means of intimidating, controlling, and punishing...I don't know how many other multimillionaires are out there, ready to devote the limitless resources at their disposal to supporting pyramid schemes run by dangerous criminals.

— Federal judge Nicholas G. Garaufis when sentencing Bronfman in September 2020

In 2018, Raniere and associate Allison Mack were arrested and indicted on several federal charges involving a cult alleged to operate within NXIVM; the charges included sex trafficking, sex trafficking conspiracy, and conspiracy to commit forced labor. Bronfman was arrested by federal agents on July 24, 2018, in New York City, and charged with money laundering and identity theft in connection with NXIVM activities. She pleaded not guilty in the United States District Court for the Eastern District of New York in Brooklyn. She was released on $100 million bond and placed on house arrest with electronic monitoring. Also charged were Bronfman's long-time mentor and NXIVM president Nancy Salzman; Salzman's daughter, NXIVM executive board member Lauren Salzman; and former NXIVM bookkeeper Kathy Russell.

On April 19, 2019, Bronfman pleaded guilty to conspiracy to conceal and harbor illegal aliens for financial gain and fraudulent use of identification. The prosecution asked for five years in prison, and she agreed to forfeit $6 million. On September 30, 2020, she was sentenced to six years, nine months in prison by a federal judge. In addition, she was fined $500,000 and was ordered to pay restitution to victim "Jane Doe 12" in the amount of $96,605.

A week after her sentencing, her lawyers asked that she be freed from the Metropolitan Detention Center, Brooklyn, while she appealed her sentence. Her lawyers called it "disparate with the sentences received by other individuals who pleaded or were found guilty of similar non-violent crimes", particularly since the prosecution had asked for only five years. Bronfman also had a liver condition that made her a higher risk for contracting COVID-19 in prison, they said. Her lawyers and the judge had already agreed that she could serve her sentence at a minimum security facility near the New York area. She spent the early part of her sentence at FDC Philadelphia, a temporary/in-transit federal prison facility normally used to house inmates prior to or during court proceedings. Bronfman was then transferred to Federal Correctional Institution, Danbury. She was then transferred back to FDC Philadelphia.

Bronfman was released to a halfway house in the Bronx on May 4, 2024. As of June 27, 2025, she is no longer in BOP custody.

=== Civil lawsuit ===
In January 2020, several NXIVM individuals, including Clare and her sister Sara, were named defendants in a civil lawsuit filed in federal court by 80 former NXIVM members. The lawsuit details allegations of fraud and abuse and charging the NXIVM organization of being a pyramid scheme, exploitation of its recruits and conducting illegal human experiments and making it "physically and psychologically difficult, and in some cases impossible, to leave the coercive community."
