= Marc Elliot =

American writer (born 1985)

- Born: 1985 (age 40–41); St. Louis, Missouri, U.S.
- Education: Washington University in St. Louis
- Occupation: Motivational speaker

Marc Elliot (born 1985) is an American former motivational speaker and a loyal follower of Keith Raniere and his organization NXIVM, a purported self-improvement company which has been widely accused of being a criminal organization and a cult. Elliot has claimed the group helped him overcome Tourette syndrome. Since Raniere was sentenced to 120 years for racketeering and other crimes, Elliot has advocated for the conviction to be overturned.

== Life and career ==
Elliot was born in 1985 in St. Louis. He was diagnosed with Hirschsprung's disease, a rare intestinal disease, at birth. A series of operations for the same left him with only 4 feet of small intestines. Elliot claims that he was diagnosed with Tourette's Syndrome at the age of 9.

On August 11, 2002, sixteen-year-old Elliot was returning home from camp via Greyhound bus when he repeatedly shouted an anti-black racial slur at black passengers. While the driver was aware of his condition, Elliot was ejected from the bus. The incident was covered by local news station WTHR.

Elliot made his first presentation at Clayton High School. In 2008, Elliot graduated from Washington University in St. Louis.

After graduation, Elliot began a career as a motivational speaker. In 2011, Campus Magazine named Elliot the winner of the best speaker and best diversity artist of the year. In 2013, Elliot self-published What Makes You Tic? My Journey From Tourette's To Tolerance.

== Role in NXIVM ==
In 2010, Elliot was recruited into Executive Success Programs (ESP), a self-help program founded by Keith Raniere, leader of the pseudoscientific NXIVM movement, which has been described as a cult and a criminal organization.

By 2011, Elliot begain claiming that NXIVM had taught him to "overcome" Tourettes. By 2014, Elliot had discontinued his public speaking tour in order to focus full-time on being a 'proctor' in NXIVM. Also in 2014, Elliot married Canadian NXIVM member Maja Miljkovic to help obtain a work visa for her; The marriage ended following an investigation by U.S. Customs and Border Protection.

=== Tourette Syndrome 'study' ===
From 2010 and 2017, NXIVM member and medical doctor Brandon Porter performed unlicensed "human subject research" on more than 200 "subjects" across a variety of projects. Elliot was involved with one project Porter oversaw, which sought to treat Tourette's. From 2015 to 2018, Elliot produced and starred in a film promoting NXIVM techniques for Tourette's; It was released in 2018 under the title My Tourette's. In 2019, Porter's medical license was revoked for violation of 40 state and federal regulations, including his role overseeing "research". Prosecutors from the United States Attorney for the Eastern District of New York in the Bronfman case wrote, "the participants in this 'study' have expressed significant distress at their involvement" and offered one victim impact statement from a study participant who said that the study "did nothing for me except ruin my self-esteem, ruin my mental health, and made me hate myself. It did not cure my Tourette’s in any way."

=== Post-conviction advocacy for Raniere ===
In 2018, the leadership of NXIVM was arrested and later convicted of sex trafficking, forced labor and racketeering. Allegations of visa fraud, identity theft, and human trafficking were central to the Department of Justice's RICO Act case. Raniere was sentenced to 120 years imprisonment.

In 2020 Elliot helped form "Make Justice Blind", an organization of loyal Raniere followers; The group is offering a monetary challenge to exonerate Raniere on both his sex trafficking and forced labor charges. In September 2020, Elliot spoke out in defense of Raniere in an interview with CBS News This Morning. In February 2023, Elliot appeared on the H3 Podcast, presented by Ethan Klein of h3h3Productions to defend Raniere. Klein, who himself is diagnosed with Tourette's Syndrome, accused Elliot of faking his Tourette's, and disputed Elliot's claims of Raniere's innocence.

In October 2021, Elliot filed a $12 million lawsuit against Lions Gate Entertainment, alleging the Starz network documentary series Seduced: Inside the NXIVM Cult libelled and defamed him. In November 2022, the court dismissed the lawsuit and granted Lions Gate Entertainment's request for attorneys' fees and costs. The judge found that the documentary did "imply that Plaintiff was a devoted member of an organization whose leader has been implicated in a range of serious sexual crimes, but this assertion – however unflattering – is substantially true."
