= Nancy Salzman =

American cult leader and convicted felon

- Born: July 16, 1954 (age 72)
- Education: Union County College; Associate Degree in Nursing
- Known for: Co-founder of NXIVM
- Children: 2 (including Lauren Salzman)
- Status: Released in March 2024 after 2 years and 27 days in prison
- Conviction: Racketeering conspiracy
- Penalty: 42 months imprisonment and a $150,000 fine

Nancy L. Salzman (born July 16, 1954) is an American co-founder of NXIVM, a multi-level marketing company and cult based near Albany, New York. A former nurse, Salzman worked with Keith Raniere in the development of the organization beginning in the 1990s.

== Background ==
Salzman was raised in a Jewish family in Cranford, New Jersey, and graduated from Cranford High School in her hometown in 1972.

She has had experience with hypnosis and NLP. In 1993, she was leading the Brief Therapy Center, an NLP Affiliated Training Institute, in Albany together with Jim Pike. Salzman is listed in the Nursys database as having a nursing license in the state of New York from 1983 to its expiration in 2019.

== NXIVM ==
Before Keith Raniere met Salzman, Raniere operated a pyramid scheme called Consumers' Buyline Inc. that was shut down by the Attorney General of New York in September 1996. In 1997, Raniere joined forces with Salzman in developing Executive Success Programs, which would eventually be rebranded as NXIVM. At NXIVM, Salzman had considerable authority as president of the company and was referred to as "Prefect" by cult members. As the second-in-command, Salzman helped create and promote Raniere's teachings and ideology and recruited individuals into NXIVM. Former members have accused Salzman of being Raniere's abettor and protector and helping Raniere control members and avoid accountability within the organizations.

According to prosecutors, Salzman was essential to the NXIVM criminal enterprise. Salzman had an immense influence on NXIVM, which included conspiracy to commit identity theft and conspiracy to alter records. Between 2005 and 2008, Salzman participated in the unlawful surveillance and investigation of perceived critics and enemies of Raniere and NXIVM. Salzman unlawfully surveilled these perceived enemies in an attempt to gain an advantage over them and stop them from criticizing the company. In Salzman's home, law enforcement agents recovered a box containing purported private banking information of many individuals perceived to be critics and enemies of Raniere, including journalists, judges and an expert on cults. Salzman also conspired to obstruct justice by altering videotapes in a civil suit between NXIVM and a former student by editing and removing portions of session videos in favor of the company. In 2003, NXIVM filed a copyright infringement suit against a former student, her parents and a cult deprogrammer. The former student filed counterclaims against NXIVM in 2008, alleging NXIVM had misrepresented the nature and effectiveness of its programs. During the pending litigation, Salzman and others altered the videotapes to remove segments that they believed would have supported the former student's claims and to make it look as if the videos were unedited. These altered videotapes were then produced in discovery by NXIVM's attorneys with the false claim that they were provided in "unedited fashion".

In March 2018, FBI agents raided Salzman's house, located on Oregon Trail in Waterford, New York, on a search warrant and seized large amounts of cash totaling $520,000 stuffed in bags, envelopes and shoe boxes, including one shoe box that held more than $390,000. Agents also seized numerous computers, data-storage devices, cameras, various mobile phones and BlackBerrys, and small amounts of Mexican and Russian currency.

On July 24, 2018, federal agents arrested Salzman, her daughter, Lauren Salzman, bookkeeper Kathy Russell and Clare Bronfman on an indictment with charges of conspiracy racketeering. In July 2018, the court found that Salzman, Keith Raniere, Clare Bronfman, Allison Mack, Kathy Russell, and Salzman's daughter had committed identity theft, extortion, forced labor, sex trafficking, money laundering, wire fraud and obstruction of justice.

In March 2019, Salzman pled guilty to charges of conspiracy racketeering under the jurisdiction of the United States District Court for the Eastern District of New York. Salzman was scheduled to be sentenced on July 10, 2019. Her sentencing, however, was pushed to a later date. On July 9, 2021, it was announced that Salzman's sentencing date would be held on August 2, 2021. This was later moved to September 8, 2021.

In January 2020, several NXIVM individuals, including Salzman and her daughter Lauren, were named defendants in a civil lawsuit filed in federal court by 80 former NXIVM members. The lawsuit charged that the NXIVM organisation was a pyramid scheme that exploited its recruits, conducted illegal human experiments, and made it "physically and psychologically difficult, and in some cases impossible, to leave the coercive community."

In September 2021, Salzman was sentenced to 42 months in prison and a $150,000 fine for racketeering conspiracy. Salzman also agreed to forfeit several real estate properties, more than $500,000 in cash and a Steinway grand piano. Salzman reported to Federal Correctional Institution, Hazelton in West Virginia on February 21, 2022, and was released on March 19, 2024.

Survivors of NXIVM filed a lawsuit against Salzman in November 2024, alleging that she refused to hand over $155,000 that she had promised to forfeit as victim compensation.
