= Sarah Edmondson =

Canadian actress

- Education: Concordia University (BFA)
- Occupations: Actress; podcaster
- Years active: 1998–present
- Spouse: Anthony Ames (m. 2010)
- Children: 2

Sarah Edmondson is a Canadian actress, podcaster, and cult awareness activist. She is known for supporting roles on Hallmark Channel, and as a voice actress, most notably in Geronimo Stilton as Thea Stilton and as Lina in the Bratz films.

Edmondson is a former member of NXIVM, a now-defunct sex cult and pyramid scheme founded by Keith Raniere. In 2017, she left the group and confirmed longstanding criticism that NXIVM operated as a cult. The resulting New York Times exposé of NXIVM's abusive practices precipitated the downfall of the organization and its leaders.

== Career ==
Edmondson studied in the theatre program at Lord Byng Secondary School, Vancouver, British Columbia. She then graduated from Concordia University, Montreal, with a BFA in Theatre Performance. She has performed in a variety of YTV programs including Are You Afraid of the Dark, Student Bodies, Big Wolf on Campus and in series such as Stargate SG-1, Andromeda, Godiva's, Edgemont and Continuum. In 2007, Edmondson was nominated for the Leo Awards in the category of "Best Lead Performance by a Female in a Short Drama" for her role in the Sparklelite Motel.

Edmondson is also a playwright. She performed her first play, a solo show, titled Dead Bird, at the 2005 Chutzpah Festival.

Edmondson starred in Lifetime Television's Killer Hair and Hostile Makeover, and A Gun to the Head in 2009, followed by J.J. Abrams's series Fringe in 2010.

Most recently, Edmondson has been seen in a series of TV series and films for Hallmark Channel, including When Calls the Heart (2014–present), Love at First Bark starring Jana Kramer, Wedding' March 2: Resorting to Love, and At Home in Mitford, based on the novel of the same name, starring Andie MacDowell and Cameron Mathison.

=== Voice work ===
She has created original voices for various Barbie, Bratz and Polly Pocket films. She also voices a number of animated series, including the characters of Lori in Transformers: Cybertron, (2005), Atlanta in Class of the Titans, Thea Stilton in Geronimo Stilton, and Sydney Gardner in Max Steel. Edmondson voiced Rainbow Dash's mom, Windy Whistles in the My Little Pony: Friendship Is Magic season seven episode "Parental Glideance".

== NXIVM ==
Edmondson was involved in the Albany, New York-based organization NXIVM. After leaving it in early 2017, she publicly denounced the organization, stating that she was invited into "DOS", a substructure within NXIVM operated by Keith Raniere and Allison Mack, and was branded with Raniere's and Mack's initials at the latter's Albany home. Edmondson said she was recruited into DOS by her friend and NXIVM member Lauren Salzman. At the time, Edmondson and other DOS recruits were told the brand was derived from ancient symbols to portray the combination of the elements.

In 2017, at the urging of Catherine Oxenberg, Edmondson contacted Frank Parlato, a former NXIVM publicist, to share details about her branding experience. Parlato blogged about it at the Frank Report, with an agreement that he would not disclose Edmondson's name to stop the next branding session.

Edmondson showed the brand in a New York Times exposé of NXIVM in 2017.

Edmondson filed a complaint with the New York State Department against physician Dr. Danielle Roberts, alleging that Roberts performed the branding. The agency replied that it lacked jurisdiction because the alleged actions did not occur in a doctor-patient relationship, and advised Edmondson to report the matter to the police. After the allegations from Edmondson and others, Roberts was suspended from practice in a Wisconsin Hospital System where she had practiced between 2012 and 2014. Raniere and Mack were subsequently arrested on charges related to DOS; and were later convicted in 2020 and 2021.

Edmondson was the subject of a 2018 CBC podcast: Uncover: Escaping NXIVM, which is an investigative podcast series about the group, its leader Keith Raniere, and Edmondson's journey to escape.

Her memoir, Scarred: The True Story of How I Escaped NXIVM, the Cult That Bound My Life, was published by Chronicle Books in September 2019.

In an interview with Vancouver Film School released February 11, 2020, Edmondson revealed that she had recently undergone surgery to have her brand removed.

Edmondson appears in the 2020 HBO documentary series The Vow, directed by Jehane Noujaim and Karim Amer.

She launched her own podcast called A Little Bit Culty, co-hosted by her husband and fellow NXIVM whistleblower Anthony "Nippy" Ames.

== Personal life ==
Edmondson was previously married to a director. In 2010, she married actor and former Ivy League quarterback Anthony Ames. The couple have two children. Edmondson is Jewish.

== Filmography ==
=== Film ===
Year	Title	Role	Notes
2000	Revenge	Young Vicky	
2001	Hope & Redemption	Cheryl Spriggs	Short film
2002	3 Days in Vain	Francis	Short film
2003	Imetacanine	Mom	Short film
2004	Galo de Barcelos: The Chicken of Portugal	Ali	Short film
2005	Dark Room	Kara	Short film
2005	Sandra Goes to Whistler	Line Dancer	Short film
2005	David	Marcy	Short film
2006	Scary Movie 4	Bar Waitress	
2006	Barbie Diaries	Courtney	Voice
2006	The Spark Lite Motel	Anna Abelson McKinnon	Short film
2006	Big Nothing	Isabella	
2007	Bratz Fashion Pixiez	Lina	Voice
2007	Bratz Kids: Sleep-Over Adventure	Cally	Voice
2008	Chaos Theory	Tequila Girl	
2008	Awkward	Rachel	Short film
2008	Shadow Riders	Jane Preston	Short film
2009	A Gun to the Head	Karen	
2017	The Cannon	Harmoni	
2017	Young George and the Dragon	Muriel	Voice

=== Television ===
Year	Title	Role	Notes
1998	The Mystery Files of Shelby Woo	Gina Malone	Episode: "The Itchy Shorts Mystery"
1998	Student Bodies	Ronnie	Episode: "The Dating Game"
1999–2000	Are You Afraid of the Dark?	Emma / Gina	2 episodes
2000	Race Against Time	Alma Cherry	Television film
2000	Big Wolf on Campus	Raven St. Clar	Episode: "Faltered States"
2001	Vampire High	Carmen	Episode: "The Summoning"
2002	UC: Undercover	Sandra	Episode: "Manhunt"
2003–2005	Edgemont	Stephanie "Steve"	10 episodes
2003	The Twilight Zone	Earnest Young Women	Episode: "The Path"
2003	Stargate SG-1	Natania	Episode: "Prophecy"
2003	The Stranger Beside Me	Susan Wayne	Television film
2003	Out of Order	Fertility Nurse	6 episodes
2005–2006	Transformers: Cybertron	Lori (voice)	52 episodes
2005	Young Blades	Girl	Episode: "Secrets of the Father"
2005	Being Ian	Tina (voice)	Episode: "Health Nut"
2005	Behind the Camera: The Unauthorized Story of 'Mork & Mindy	Gina Hecht	Television film
2005	Andromeda	Larissa Knowles	Episode: "The Heart of the Journey: Part 1"
2006	Godiva's	Hot Date	Episode: "Exit Strategies"
2006	The Dead Zone	Young Woman	Episode: "Forbidden Fruit"
2007	My Name is Sarah	Olivia	Television film
2007–2008	Class of the Titans	Atlanta, Lori, Amalthea (voice)	26 episodes (season 2)
2009	What Color Is Love?	Amy Jansen	Television film
2009	Killer Hair	Brooke	Television film
2009	Hostile Makeover	Brooke	Television film
2009–2017	Geronimo Stilton	Thea Stilton (voice)	76 episodes
2009–2010	Psych	Gina	2 episodes
2010	Fringe	Pauline Hess	Episode: "Jacksonville"
2010–2015	The Little Prince	The Rose (voice)	31 episodes; English dub
2010	Seduced by Love	Ava	Television film
2010	One Angry Juror	Louise	Television film
2012–2013	Continuum	Heather Martin	2 episodes
2013–2015	Max Steel	Sydney Garner (voice)	27 episodes
2014	When Calls the Heart	Miriam Garner	Episode: "Cease and Desist"
2015	The Whispers	Mrs. Brewster	Episode: "Darkest Fears"
2017	Love at First Bark	Cassie Guggenheim	Television film
2017	My Little Pony: Friendship Is Magic	Windy Whistles (voice)	Episode: "Parental Gildeance"
2017	Wedding March 2: Resorting to Love	Lisa	Television film
2017	At Home in Mitford	Marge Owens	Television film
2018	Dinotrux	Roxie (voice)	Episode: "Opposites"
2018	Wedding of Dreams	Sarah Rice	Television film
2018	Salvation	Nora	5 episodes
2018	Welcome to Christmas	Rachel Dane	Television film
2019	The Sisterhood	Trish Britton (Reporter)	Television film
2020–22	The Vow	Herself	12 episodes
2020	Five Star Christmas	Annie Halston	Television film

=== Video games ===
Year	Title	Role	Notes	Source
2011	Trinity: Souls of Zill Ơll	Sheelagh, Argilshaia		
2017	Thimbleweed Park	Additional voices		

=== Miscellaneous ===
Year	Title	Role	Notes
2013	Inhumans	Tonaja, Marista, Black Widow	Motion comic
