= Nicole Daedone =

American writer, business executive convicted of forced labor conspiracy

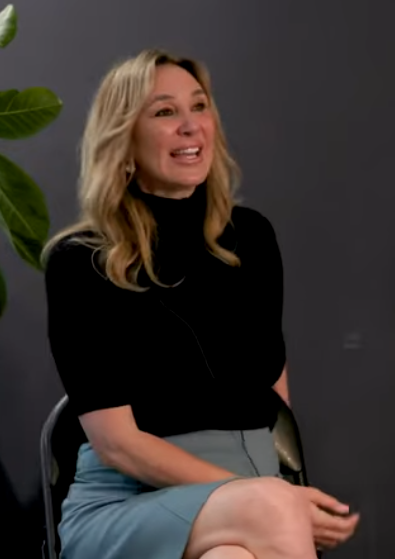
- Born: Nicole Anne Daedone; August 24, 1967 (age 59); Los Gatos, California, US
- Education: San Francisco State University
- Occupations: Writer, business executive
- Organization: OneTaste
- Status: Imprisoned
- Conviction: Forced labor conspiracy (18 U.S.C. § 1594(b))
- Penalty: 108 months imprisonment $887,877.64 restitution 2 years of supervised release
- Accomplice: Rachel Cherwitz

Details
- Victims: 7 confirmed "Scores" alleged
- Imprisoned at: Metropolitan Detention Center, Brooklyn
- Website: nicoledaedone.com

Nicole Anne Daedone (born August 24, 1967) is an American writer and entrepreneur, convicted of running a forced labor conspiracy as the CEO of the company she co-founded in 2004, OneTaste. A federal jury in 2025 convicted Daedone for the crime of forced labor conspiracy in a scheme enriching herself while subjecting OneTaste members to "economic, sexual, emotional and psychological abuse; surveillance; indoctrination; and intimidation." In 2026, she was sentenced to 9 years imprisonment, and forfeiture of the $12 million she received for the sale of her share of the company.

== Early life and education ==
Nicole Daedone was born in Los Gatos, California and raised by a single mother.

Daedone's father Joseph Daedone only appeared sporadically in her life. Court records indicate he was repeatedly arrested for sexual abuse of children, including one grandchild.

Nicole Daedone has given conflicting information about her relationship with her father:

- She told Gawker journalist Nitasha Tiku that "he never behaved inappropriately."
- Speaking with Ellen Huet, confidants of Daedone said she described Joseph Daedone sexually molesting her.
- In a since-deleted blog from 2007, Daedone claimed that she "seduced" her father when she was aged six.

Daedone earned a bachelor's degree in gender communications and semantics from San Francisco State University in 1994.

After graduating, she opened an art gallery, worked as a waitress at a pizzeria, stripped at Lusty Lady and escorted. In sex work, she has described a client paying a premium to throttle her. Daedone and associates have described her heavy use of LSD, psilocybin, and methamphetamine in this time period.

She studied with teachers of yoga and Buddhist meditation, and with Ray Vetterlein, who was in turn inspired by the group Lafayette Morehouse, an intentional community founded by Victor Baranco. Many journalists have described Morehouse as a "sex commune" or "sex cult".

Former students of Baranco set up their own practices and groups, among them The Welcomed Consensus. Daedone lived at The Welcomed Consensus, a community formed by former Lafayette Morehouse students, for two years. According to Ken Blackman, a member of Welcomed Consensus and later OneTaste, "the Welcomed Consensus had no desire to be mainstream. But, Daedone had bigger ideas."

== Career ==
Daedone published her first book, Slow Sex, in 2012. Since 2022, she has published a number of books on a range of topics. Daedone draws parallels between slow sex and the Slow Food movement associated with chef Alice Waters.

=== OneTaste ===
OneTaste was cofounded in San Francisco by Nicole Daedone and Robert Kandell. Daedone stated that, prior to starting OneTaste, she had been introduced to orgasmic meditation by a man who she variously described as a Buddhist, a monk, and "a cute guy" who said "the best pickup line I'd ever heard". In a history of the OneTaste organization, Ellen Huet identifies the individual as Erwan Davon, a student at Lafayette Morehouse and its offshoot Welcomed Consensus.

OneTaste later trademarked the term "orgasmic meditation" (OM) for intellectual property through the company's classes. OneTaste operated two communal-style "urban retreat" centers, one in San Francisco's Soma District and another in Lower Manhattan. It then expanded to Los Angeles, London and other cities. The company produced media, workshops, weekend retreats, and a coach training program. It owned its own glamping-style retreat center called "The Land" in Philo, California. The space was rented out for events organized by SoulCycle, Louis Vuitton, Samasource, and Giphy. In 2014, OneTaste was listed as an Inc. 5000 fastest growing company.

An open secret of the company was that Daedone's boyfriend Reese Jones (of Singularity University) kept the company afloat for several years. He was documented providing at least $800,000 from 2007 through 2011. In return, Daedone procured the sexual services of OneTaste subordinates (euphemistically called "handlers") for Jones. A statement by Eros Platform, a successor to OneTaste, states that Jones "was instrumental in the establishment of OneTaste Inc." The statement does not deny that Daedone procured sexual partners for Jones, but says that he provided "a safe and entirely consensual adult environment for personal exploration and development."

According to Huet, Jones's finances cratered in 2012; Daedone subsequently pressured subordinates to find ways to pay him back. OneTaste then began its "Coaching Program" of expensive trainings for accreditations. It also began using a boiler room operation and hard sell tactics. Rachel Cherwitz (eventually Daedone's codefendant) was employed to ensure salespersons met quotas. She encouraged staff to keep notes on prospects, including profiles of vulnerabilities to exploit for further sales. Cherwitz charged women staff (referred to as "fluffers") with giving single men partners to stroke. According to Huet's sources, Cherwitz instructed fluffers to maintain plausible deniability about tactics running afoul of prostitution laws.

=== Nonprofits ===
According to author Ellen Huet, Daedone has serially employed a tactic since her time with Welcomed Consensus: using nonprofits for self-serving purposes. Huet describes Daedone and associates founding the organization Fill Up America, ostensibly to collect excess food and clothing from businesses in San Francisco to distribute to the poor. Volunteers told Huet that Daedone and her friends kept prime goods for themselves.

IRS records indicate that Fill Up America organization obtained tax-exempt status and employer identification number (EIN) in 2002. Copies of Form 990 records hosted by ProPublica indicate Fill Up America changed names several times since: in the 2013 tax year its name changed to "OneTaste Foundation"; its website (listed on tax records) featured OneTaste curriculum on orgasm and Orgasmic Meditation. In its 2019 filing the name was listed as "Love to Table"; its website did not list a connection to OneTaste.

As of 2026, the name of the organization tied to the employer identification number is "Unconditional Freedom", which it began using in the 2022 tax year. According to Huet, the organization "teaches spirituality and mindfulness in two California prisons, with a mission statement of “turning prisons into monasteries", but mainly promotes materials authored by Daedone. In October 2022, MendoFever reported that Mendocino County Sheriff discontinued an Unconditional Freedom program at the county jail after discovering its links to OneTaste.

== Federal investigation and forced labor conspiracy conviction ==
In 2015, OneTaste paid a former employee a six-figure settlement for enduring sexual assault, harassment, and labor law violations. The settlement was confidential until the 2018 Bloomberg report. The report prompted a Federal Bureau of Investigation probe into OneTaste for prostitution, sex trafficking, and violations of labor law.

=== United States v. Cherwitz ===
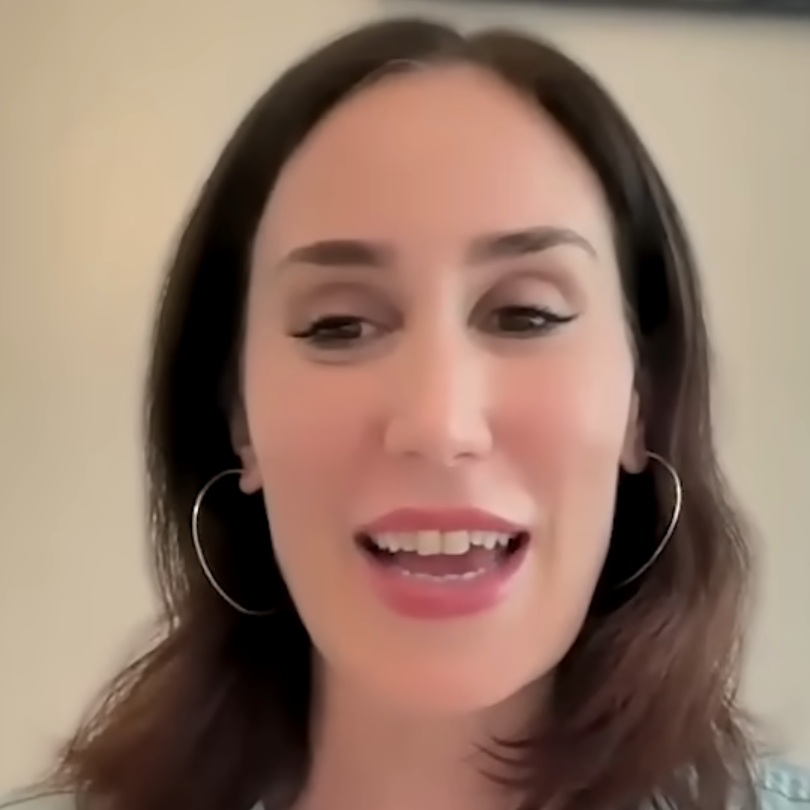
Rachel Cherwitz (also known as Rachel Pelletier), the Head of Sales for OneTaste from 2009 to 2018; co-defendant in the United States v. Cherwitz case.

In June 2023, a grand jury indicted Daedone and former head of sales Rachel Cherwitz on charges of forced labor conspiracy.

==== Media campaign ====
The New York Times noted that Daedone hired crisis communications specialist Juda Engelmayer, who has previously worked for convicted sex offender Harvey Weinstein. The article noted that Engelmayer and Daedone's defense team, "were cheerful, as if there were no greater privilege than being paid handsomely to wage war against people they see as woke and whiny."

A report by Vanity Fair found that Engelmayer "reached out" to Frank Parlato Jr., a blogger who ran articles attacking OneTaste as a cult. Following this contact, Parlato's blog changed to defend OneTaste and Daedone while disparaging prosecutors, witnesses, and presiding Judge Diane Gujarati. According to Ellen Huet, Parlato's articles during the course of the trial called the witnesses “stupid,” “cowardly,” “crybabies,” “liars,” “regretful narcissists,” “losers,” and “imbeciles,” and mocked one accuser's weight in an article accompanied by photos of her clad in a bikini.

==== Pretrial motions ====
In the pretrial phase, the defense claimed that FBI Special Agent Elliot McGinnis, who reportedly led the investigation for five years, undermined the case's integrity by advising witnesses to destroy evidence, mishandling privileged materials, and presenting misleading information in sworn affidavits. However, presiding Judge Diane Gujarati denied a motion to dismiss, ruling that the defense had not sufficiently demonstrated bad faith or that these issues prejudiced the prosecution's case, but did push back the trial, initially scheduled for January 13, 2025 to May 5, 2025.

On March 17, 2025, the US Attorney for the Eastern District of New York announced that they would not use a key witness's journals in the case. The witness had falsely presented them as written about the time she was a OneTaste member, but instead had "physically copied the relevant portion of the Handwritten Journals after typing the Typewritten Journals".

==== Trial ====
Allegations against the leaders of OneTaste at trial are recapitulated in a government sentencing memorandum.

[H]einous acts of manipulation, coercion and exploitation that Daedone or her co-conspirators committed were the following:

- directing victims to serve as “handlers” for OneTaste’s main investor, Reese Jones, including cooking for him, sexually servicing him each day and performing other labor;
- coercing victims to allow OneTaste clients and prospective customers to stroke their clitorises;
- compelling victims to stroke OneTaste clients and prospective customers’ penises, and to have sex with them;
- directing that victims incur massive debt to pay for OneTaste courses and to continue to remain part of the OneTaste community; and
- directing victims to work around-the-clock – including menial and sexual labor – for little or no pay.

The victims performed these acts, and others, out of fear of serious harm, including physical, psychological and financial harm. Indeed, those who resisted were punished with negative employment consequences, shunning, sexual abuse and threats of physical violence, among other things. Nearly every trial witness described how Daedone and her coconspirators engaged in a campaign of indoctrination, grooming, isolation, manipulation, use of past trauma, monitoring, public shaming, relationship disruption, sexual abuse, physical exhaustion and financial harm to force their victims’ labor.

The trial started on May 5, 2025. During the trial, former CTO Christopher Hubbard described OneTaste as a "sex cult", and stated that he and Daedone arranged BDSM activities for entrepreneur Reese Jones of Singularity University, involving Jones "either giving or receiving some form of sexual activity" with OneTaste members. The government notes that from 2007 and through 2011, Jones invested at least $800,000 in the company, and also subsidized Daedone's lifestyle.

A video entered into evidence suggesting Daedone was indifferent as to consent, including her claim that rape could be "deflected" if the victim would "turn on 100 percent, because then there is nothing to rape." Several women who worked for OneTaste testified against Daedone and Cherwitz described instances of uncompensated and forced labor ranging from sex work with investors to menial domestic work including cooking and cleaning.

==== Verdict ====
On June 9, 2025, the jury in the case found Daedone and Cherwitz guilty on federal forced labor charges.

Announcing the verdict, the Acting United States Attorney for the Eastern District of New York Joseph Nocella Jr. said, "The jury’s verdict has unmasked Daedone and Cherwitz for who they truly are: grifters who preyed on vulnerable victims by making empty promises of sexual empowerment and wellness only to manipulate them into performing labor and services for the defendants’ benefit."

Lawyers for Daedone and Cherwitz told NPR that they intend to appeal the verdict to the United States Court of Appeals for the Second Circuit. Publicist Juda Engelmayer says the verdict "crosses a dangerous line — criminalizing freedom of religion, assembly, expression, and speech."

Following the verdict, Judge Gujarati ordered Daedone and Cherwitz remanded to the custody of the United States Marshals Service citing "witness intimidation" activities of Engelmayer and OneTaste member Marcus Ratnathicam.

==== Sentencing ====
In their sentencing memorandum, prosecutors requested the 20-year statutory maximum sentence for Daedone. In an asset forfeiture motion, prosecutors argued that the $12 million Nicole Daedone raised through the 2017 sale of her stake in OneTaste were proceeds of the criminal forced labor conspiracy, as were funds held in Daedone's bank accounts. Judge Gujarati granted the motion on March 18, 2026.

Ahead of the sentencing date, Daedone requested permission from the court to don her own clothes instead of their Bureau of Prisons-issue uniforms. The court denied the request.

The court sentenced Daedone to 9 years imprisonment on March 30, 2026. At the sentencing hearing, Judge Gujarati said that Daedone "does not appear to be remorseful".

As of March 2026 Daedone is held at the Metropolitan Detention Center, Brooklyn while awaiting permanent assignment. The Federal Bureau of Prisons lists Daedone as inmate register number 63699-510.

== Continuing activities ==
As of March 2026, OneTaste (using the names "Eros Platform" and "Team Nicole") continues to hold events promoting orgasmic meditation with the image and likeness of Nicole Daedone and Rachel Cherwitz using social media, virtual reality headsets, computer-generated imagery and large language model text generation. One such event was a dinner promoted on Reason.com with tickets distributed by Eventbrite, featuring an avatar of Daedone. Others on the bill were Reason editor Elizabeth Nolan Brown, activist Topeka Sam and Massachusetts Institute of Technology professor Vivian Siegel.

The New York Times described the event as "emblematic of the nonstop campaign by Ms. Daedone, OneTaste and her fervent fans to burnish her image as a martyr for women’s liberation." As part of the event, attendees were encouraged to donate to fund more dinners. Organizers gave donors of $100 Daedone's latest book as a premium. According to the Times article, the book's draft text was sent to followers "through the email system monitored by the Federal Bureau of Prisons". Bureau of Prisons policy describes prisoners' use of the Trust Fund Limited Inmate Computer System (TRULINCS) - Electronic Messaging system as a "privilege" that may be revoked.

=== Pursuit of executive clemency ===
In remarks to the New York Times, Daedone's lawyer Jennifer Bonjean has stated that she would "exhaust all avenues to get my client released" and "would of course be hopeful the [Trump] administration would look at the case."

Attorney Alan Dershowitz told NBC News that he is lobbying the Trump administration to pardon Daedone.

A June 29, 2026 report in The Atlantic suggested that Trump administration's "Pardon Czar" Alice Marie Johnson placed Daedone on a proposed list of candidates for a mass pardon to coincide with the United States Semiquincentennial. Daedone was not pardoned, and remains an inmate listed by the Bureau of Prisons.

== In the media ==
Daedone is the focus of the 2022 Netflix documentary Orgasm Inc: The Story of OneTaste.

OneTaste is the subject of Ellen Huet’s Empire of Orgasm: Sex, Power, and the Downfall of a Wellness Cult (2025).

In 2024, Daedone was also the focus of an NBC News profile by Chloe Melas.

== Publications ==
- Slow Sex: the Art and Craft of the Female Orgasm. New York: Grand Central Publishing. 2012. ISBN 978-0-446-56718-3. OCLC 858900850.
- The Eros Sutras. Vol. 1: Principles. Great Work Publishing. 2023. ISBN 978-1-961064-00-3. OCLC 1390560063.
- The Eros Sutras. Vol. 2: Tumescence. Great Work Publishing. 2023. ISBN 978-1-961064-02-7.
- The Eros Sutras. Vol. 3: Orgasmic Meditation. Great Work Publishing. 2023. ISBN 978-1-961064-16-4.
- Erotic Justice: Making Social Change from Love. Great Work Publishing. 2023. ISBN 978-1-961064-07-2.
- From Guards to Guardians: Rebuilding Prisons from the Ground Up. Great Work Publishing. 2023. ISBN 978-1-961064-15-7. OCLC 1396699143.
- Play: A Path to Genius. Great Work Publishing. 2023. ISBN 978-1-961064-10-2. OCLC 1407314448.
- The Eros Sutras. Vol. 4: Relationship. Great Work Publishing. 2024. ISBN 978-1-961064-24-9.
- Jailbirds in Flight: Everything You've Wanted to Know About Enlightenment in Prison but Were Afraid to Ask. Great Work Publishing. 2025. ISBN 978-1961064430.
- The Eros Sutras. Vol. 5: Liberation & Justice. Great Work Publishing. 2026. ISBN 978-1961064379.
