= OneTaste =

Sexual health business

- Type: Private
- Founder: Nicole Daedone and Robert Kandell
- Headquarters: San Francisco, California, United States
- Number of locations: 8 (2016)
- Area served: Los Angeles; Harlem; London
- Key people: Anjuli Ayer (CEO)
- Revenue: $6.5 M (2014)
- Number of employees: 28 (2014)
- Website: onetaste.us

OneTaste Incorporated, currently operating as The Institute of OM, is a business sponsoring seminars, classes, workshops, lectures, and discussion groups around the practice of "orgasmic meditation" (OM). (Note: The term "orgasmic meditation" is trademarked for use in educational services. It was first recorded in commerce in 2005; the USPTO granted trademark to OneTaste's subsidiary Caravan Retreats Incorporated in 2013. As of 2026 the owner is OneTaste successor group Society for Eros Practice and Philosophy. See US Serial Number: 85159647, "Orgasmic Meditation") In June 2025, a federal prosecution convicted OneTaste leaders Nicole Daedone and Rachel Cherwitz (also known as Rachel Pelletier) for the crime of forced labor conspiracy for the mistreatment of its employees. In 2026, Daedone was sentenced to 9 years imprisonment, and Cherwitz received 6.5 years.

Nicole Daedone and Robert Kandell founded OneTaste in San Francisco. An open secret of the company was that Reese Jones (of Singularity University) kept the company afloat, providing at least $800,000 from 2007 through 2011. In return, Daedone (Jones's live-in girlfriend) procured the sexual services of OneTaste subordinates for Jones. The company and independent affiliates expanded to multiple cities, including London, Los Angeles, New York City, and San Francisco, selling educational courses and retreats demonstrating the purported benefits of orgasmic meditation.

OneTaste describes orgasmic meditation as an activity in which a participant (usually male) strokes the genital area of a female participant while she concentrates on the resulting physical sensations. OneTaste events demonstrated the technique in front of live audience and employees were instructed to perform and undergo stroking regularly, including from strangers. Over 35,000 people came through the doors of OneTaste for events, classes or to learn the practice of Orgasmic Meditation. Former employees reported enduring stroking under duress including "economic, sexual, emotional and psychological abuse, surveillance, indoctrination and intimidation". In the trial of Daedone and Cherwitz, victims testified to psychological and physiological harms, including depression and post-traumatic stress disorder.

A 2009 New York Times profile was the first national exposure for the company. Daedone received mainstream exposure through publishing a book with Hachette, speaking at a TED Talk and a Goop-sponsored event, as well as an endorsement in The 4-Hour Body by Tim Ferriss As OneTaste grew and received more media attention, the organization was accused of cult-like operations, similar to Lafayette Morehouse, an intentional community of which Daedone was formerly a member. An exposé by Bloomberg News in 2018 led to OneTaste being investigated by the FBI for sex trafficking, prostitution, and violations of labor law.

As controversy mounted, OneTaste closed all of their U.S. locations and stopped hosting in-person classes. A trial in 2025 ended in the convictions of Daedone and Cherwitz. By 2026, the organization was documented holding events (under the names "Eros Platform" and "Team Nicole") to promote orgasmic meditation. Despite their convictions and imprisonment, the organization used the image and likeness of Nicole Daedone and Rachel Cherwitz with a combination of social media, virtual reality headsets, computer-generated imagery and large language model text generation.

== History ==
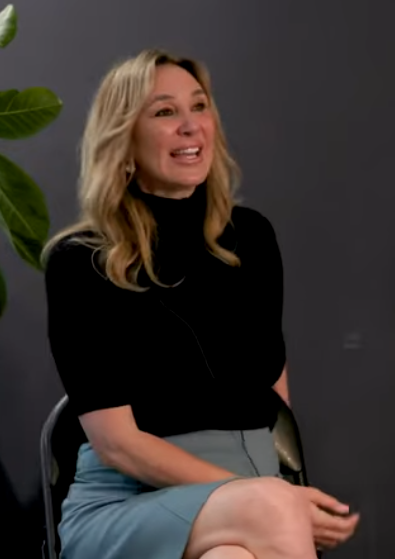
Co-founder Nicole Daedone in 2024

OneTaste began in 2004 and was cofounded in San Francisco by Robert Kandell and Nicole Daedone. Daedone stated that a man introduced her to orgasmic meditation before she started OneTaste. The Daily Telegraph reported that Daedone changed her description of the man upon retelling the origin story, having portrayed him on different occasions as a Buddhist, a monk, and "a cute guy" who said "the best pickup line I'd ever heard". In a history of the OneTaste organization, Ellen Huet identifies the individual as Erwan Davon, a student at Lafayette Morehouse and its offshoot Welcomed Consensus.

OneTaste trademarked the orgasmic meditation (OM) procedure delivered through the company's classes. It originally operated two communal-style "urban retreat" centers, one in San Francisco's Soma District and another in Lower Manhattan. OneTaste then expanded to Los Angeles and London. The company produced media, workshops, weekend retreats, and a coach training program. It owned its own glamping-style retreat center called "The Land" in Philo, California. The space was rented out for events organized by SoulCycle, Louis Vuitton, Samasource, and Giphy. In 2014, OneTaste was listed as an Inc. 5000 fastest growing company.

An open secret of the company was that Daedone's boyfriend Reese Jones (of Singularity University) kept the company afloat. He was documented providing at least $800,000 from 2007 through 2011. In return, Daedone procured the sexual services of OneTaste subordinates (euphemistically called "handlers") for Jones. A statement by Eros Platform, a successor to OneTaste, states that Jones "was instrumental in the establishment of OneTaste Inc.". The statement does not deny that Daedone procured sexual partners for Jones, but says that he provided "a safe and entirely consensual adult environment for personal exploration and development."

According to Huet, Jones's finances cratered in 2012; Daedone subsequently pressured subordinates to find ways to pay Reese back. OneTaste then began its "Coaching Program" of expensive trainings for accreditations. It also began a boiler room operation using hard sell tactics. Rachel Cherwitz was employed to ensure salespersons met quotas. She encouraged staff to keep notes on students, including ways of exerting pressure (such as noting divorces) for further sales. Women staff referred to as "fluffers" were employed to give single men partners to stroke. According to Huet's sources, fluffers were instructed to maintain plausible deniability about tactics running afoul of prostitution laws.

Robert Kandell sold his stake in the company for $1.5 million in 2014. Daedone sold her ownership of OneTaste to three participants for $12 million in 2017. The company stated that it received $12 million in revenue during the same year.

Bloomberg Businessweek published an exposé of the company in June 2018. According to the report, OneTaste offered orgasmic meditation courses for $499 to $16,000, as well as a $60,000 annual subscription that included access to all courses. In October 2018, OneTaste closed all of their U.S. locations and stopped hosting in-person classes. By 2022, OneTaste had rebranded itself as The Institute of OM.

OneTaste opened a New York facility in autumn 2024, where the company provided orgasmic meditation lessons. In 2025, OneTaste also offered lessons through their Eros Platform website, and CEO Anjuli Ayer announced their intent to adopt a franchise-based business model.

== "Orgasmic Meditation" ==
OneTaste marketed educational events (including "seminars, classes, lectures and discussion groups") centered on "orgasmic meditation" (OM). In these events, a clothed and usually male "stroker" stimulates a female "strokee" by softly fingering the upper-left section of her clitoris for a timed 15 minutes. Prior to physical contact, the stroker describes the appearance of the strokee's vulva to her and puts on a lubricated glove.

=== Origins ===
Daedone's former associates concede that "orgasmic meditation" was derived from "deliberate orgasm" (DO), (Note: The term "deliberate orgasm" is trademarked for use in "audio, visual, and multi-media recordings featuring music, adult entertainment and information in the field of human sexuality". It was registered in 2009, but its first recorded use in commerce was 1996. As of 2026 the trademark owner is The Welcomed Consensus, in the name of Wendy Testerman. See US Serial Number: 77700305, "Deliberate Orgasm") a similar activity marketed by the Welcomed Consensus in videos. Daedone was previously a member of the group. Several women have attested to abusive practices by Welcomed Consensus and its leaders, including Daedone during her tenure.

=== Promotion ===
The company markets OM as a mindfulness practice in which both participants focus their attention on the sensation with the stated goal of developing "connective resonance" between themselves.

OneTaste materials are contradictory about the nature of OM: on the one hand, claiming it "shouldn't be considered a sex act" while encouraging the partners to use vulgar terms for the genitalia (e.g., "pussy" and "cock") to arouse the participants. OneTaste euphemistically called stroking and other forms of sexual contact "research", and referred to pairings (including assigned pairings of strangers) as "research partners".

According to testimony and evidence heard at the criminal trial of Nicole Daedone and Rachel Cherwitz, OneTaste's promotion of "orgasmic meditation" went the extent of it making it a compulsory activity by employees, particularly those in OneTaste communal homes. Victims reported that "Daedone and Cherwitz insisted that employees engage in these sex acts even if they found them disgusting; those who resisted were punished with negative employment consequences, shunning, sexual abuse and threats of physical violence, among other things."

=== Related practices ===
OneTaste also promoted "male OMing", which involves a woman performing a 15-minute handjob on a man. According to criminal court case records "men willing to pay for certain courses, typically taught by Daedone, Cherwitz, or other OneTaste leaders, could expect to have their penises stroked or their prostates massaged, or otherwise engage in OM, often by female OneTaste workers."

== Controversies ==
Several journalists have compared OneTaste to a cult and pyramid scheme.

=== Testimonials about orgasmic meditation benefits ===
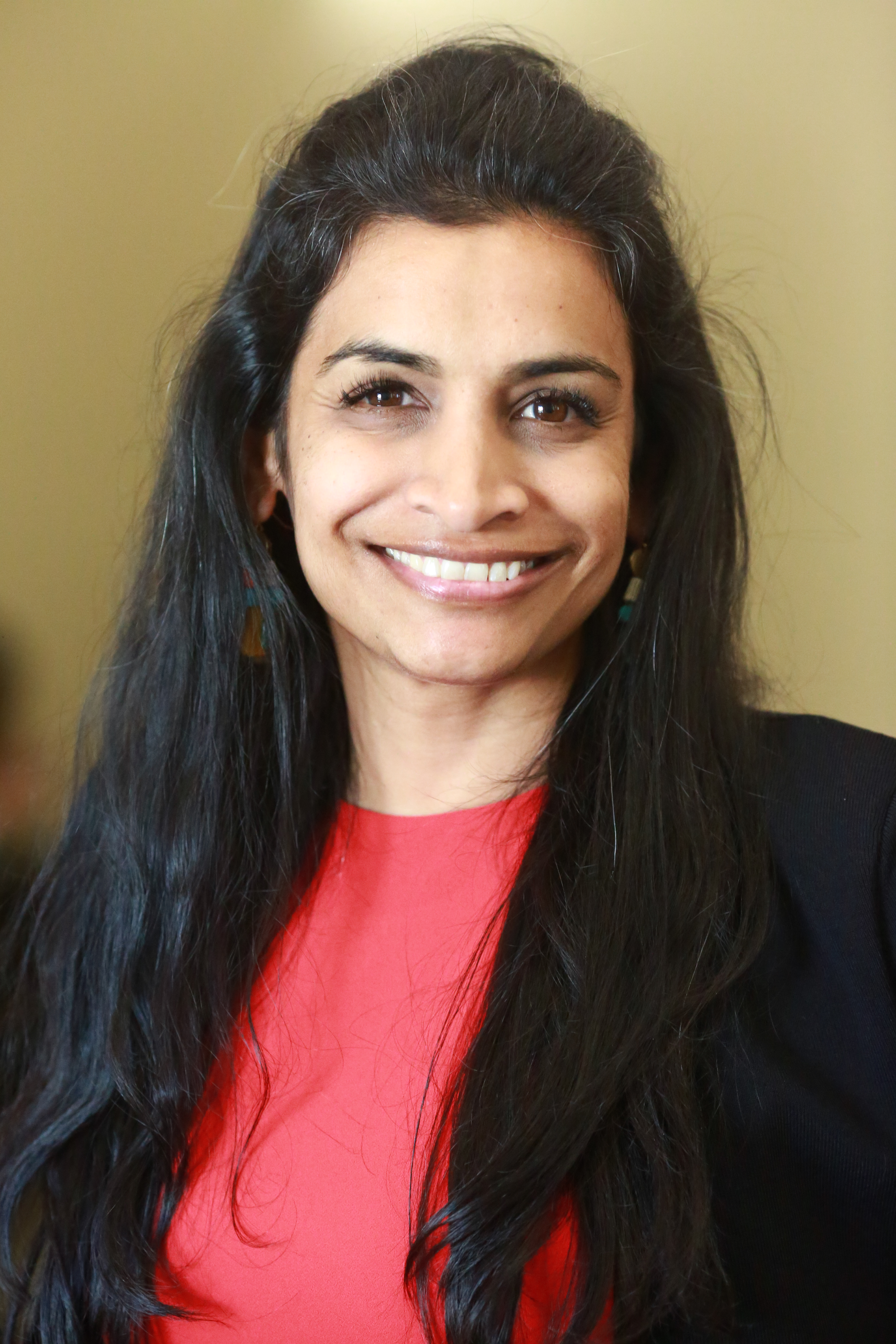
Portrait of Pooja Lakshmin, a former OneTaste student turned critic.

A 2013 article in The Tyee used quotes from Pooja Lakshmin, a Stanford University-educated psychiatrist and resident of a OneTaste communal house, attesting to medical studies on the benefits of orgasmic meditation. Lakshmin has since said that her medical background was used to give an air of legitimacy to the group while she was kept ignorant of the inner workings of OneTaste. She left after two years with the group and publicly repudiated her statements of support for the group, which she calls a cult.

=== Accusations of coercive control ===
Ellen Huet, gathering accounts of OneTaste's history, found Nicole Daedone and members of the organization as embracing the label of "cult" through its early years. She insisted on banning the term in OneTaste circles once members began living communally (first in a OneTaste center and then out of a converted warehouse in San Francisco's SoMa neighborhood). In these communal spaces, residents were encouraged by Daedone to stroke one another and have communal sex with other residents and with prospective recruits.

In a 2009 New York Times interview, Daedone insisted she does not aspire to guru status, while acknowledging that "there's a high potential for this to be a cult." The Times noted "Daedone, is a polarizing personality, whom admirers venerate as a sex diva, although some former members say she has cult like powers over her followers... Much of the community's tone revolves around Ms. Daedone, a woman of considerable charm, although detractors regard her as a master manipulator."

Following the New York Times article, accusations of OneTaste as cultlike ran in several media, including GoodTimes Weekly, Vice, Salon.com and Playboy.

=== Business model and practices ===
Several media profiles have highlighted OneTaste's questionable business practices.

A 2016 episode of the podcast Love + Radio is dedicated to the experience of a woman who had increasingly fraught relations with OneTaste. The Cut suggested that it may be a pyramid scheme. The Frisky described OneTaste as "Landmark Forum for the clitoris." A Refinery29 article cited the organization's "potentially aggressive sales tactics." Playboy Magazine compared OneTaste to Scientology and Landmark Forum, saying it had a "pyramidal pricing structure". A week-long training with Nicole Daedone was advertised at $36,000.

The book Sensation by Isabel Losada ends with a "Warning" about "'hard sell' techniques... 'One Taste' (like many businesses) offer a wide range of courses which are outside the price range of most bank accounts. I'll say it again. Please don't spend money that you don't have."

A 2018 profile in Bloomberg OneTaste suggested exploitative practices, including pressure to spend heavily and go into debt. OneTaste teaches their members that money is just an emotional obstacle. The Bloomberg article was critical of how the company treated its employees and consultants, often pressuring them to take expensive courses, programs, and retreats that drove them into debt.

=== Human trafficking and sexual abuse ===
In November 2020, BBC Radio 4 released a 10-part investigative podcast entitled The Orgasm Cult that spoke to former workers of the company, detailing allegations of emotional, financial and sexual abuse. At a criminal trial similar testimony including several employees reported enduring "orgasmic meditation" stroking under duress. Victims testified to psychological and physiological harms, including depression and post-traumatic stress disorder.

The podcast also spoke to experts about how OneTaste (and the broader unregulated wellness industry) takes advantage of the medical establishment's dismissal of women's health concerns.

=== Charity self-dealing ===
According to author Ellen Huet, Daedone brought to OneTaste a tactic from the Welcomed Consensus: using nonprofits for self-serving purposes. Huet describes Daedone and associates founding the organization Fill Up America, ostensibly to collect excess food and clothing from businesses in San Francisco to distribute to the poor. Volunteers told Huet that Daedone and her friends kept prime goods for themselves and used them to subsidize OneTaste's communal houses.

Internal Revenue Service records indicate that Fill Up America organization obtained tax-exempt status and employer identification number (EIN) in 2002. Copies of Form 990 records hosted by ProPublica indicate Fill Up America changed names several times since: in the 2013 tax year its name changed to "OneTaste Foundation"; its website (listed on tax records) featured OneTaste curriculum on orgasm and Orgasmic Meditation. In its 2019 filing the name was listed as "Love to Table"; its website did not list a connection to OneTaste.

=== Netflix documentary and SLAPP suit ===
A Netflix documentary film about OneTaste and its controversies, Orgasm Inc: The Story of OneTaste, was released on November 5, 2022. Prior to the release, fourteen former OneTaste members filed a lawsuit against Netflix, seeking a temporary restraining order and the removal of sexually explicit imagery that was allegedly "misappropriated" by a former OneTaste employee. Their request was denied by a Los Angeles judge.

According to The Daily Beast, a former OneTaste employee stated that the lawsuit was "a last-ditch effort by OneTaste to protect its reputation" and "may be nothing more than an attempt to silence its victims, some of whom have accused the company of functioning like a cult". The plaintiffs withdrew their lawsuit after the documentary was released with their faces obscured.

The lawsuit saw Netflix win a motion under California's anti-SLAPP law to force OneTaste to pay the costs of defending the suit.

== Federal investigation and litigation ==
In 2015, OneTaste paid a former employee a six-figure settlement for enduring sexual assault, harassment, and labor law violations. The settlement was confidential until the 2018 Bloomberg report. The report prompted a Federal Bureau of Investigation probe into OneTaste for prostitution, sex trafficking, and violations of labor law.

=== United States v. Cherwitz ===
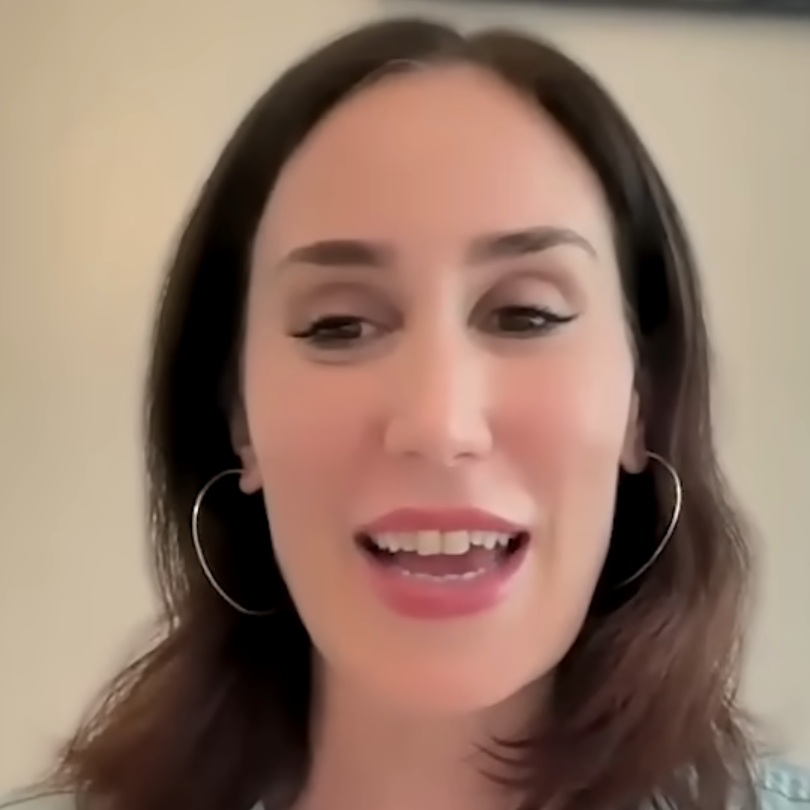
Rachel Cherwitz (also known as Rachel Pelletier), the Head of Sales for OneTaste from 2009 to 2018; co-defendant in the United States v. Cherwitz case.

In June 2023, a grand jury indicted Daedone and former head of sales Rachel Cherwitz on charges of forced labor conspiracy.

==== Media campaign ====
The New York Times noted that Daedone hired crisis communications specialist Juda Engelmayer, who has previously worked for convicted sex offender Harvey Weinstein. The article noted that Engelmayer and Daedone's defense team, "were cheerful, as if there were no greater privilege than being paid handsomely to wage war against people they see as woke and whiny."

A report by Vanity Fair found that Engelmayer "reached out" to Frank Parlato Jr., a blogger who ran articles attacking OneTaste as a cult. Following this contact, Parlato's blog changed to defend OneTaste and Daedone while disparaging prosecutors, witnesses, and presiding Judge Diane Gujarati. According to Ellen Huet, Parlato's articles during the course of the trial called the witnesses "stupid," "cowardly," "crybabies," "liars," "regretful narcissists," "losers," and "imbeciles," and mocked one accuser's weight in an article accompanied by photos of her clad in a bikini.

A OneTaste member and publicist Marcus Ratnathicam, speaking with the New York Times, said that the organization had "reached out to everyone" but found a particularly receptive audience among right-wing and libertarian media outlets and influencers including Reason.com, Darren Beattie, Roger Stone, and Matt Gaetz. Ratnathicam was later excoriated by the presiding judge for "making faces" at trial witnesses seeking to intimidate them.

==== Pretrial motions ====
In the pretrial phase, the defense claimed that FBI Special Agent Elliot McGinnis, who reportedly led the investigation for five years, undermined the case's integrity by advising witnesses to destroy evidence, mishandling privileged materials, and presenting misleading information in sworn affidavits. However, presiding Judge Diane Gujarati denied a motion to dismiss, ruling that the defense had not sufficiently demonstrated bad faith or that these issues prejudiced the prosecution's case, but did push back the trial, initially scheduled for January 13, 2025 to May 5.

On March 17, 2025, the US Attorney for the Eastern District of New York announced that they would not use a key witness's journals in the case. The witness had falsely presented them as written about the time she was a OneTaste member, but instead had "physically copied the relevant portion of the Handwritten Journals after typing the Typewritten Journals".

Prosecutors noted that before the trial, someone leaked discovery materials under a protective order to an attorney associated with OneTaste (but not the criminal trial), who subsequently referenced those materials in a threatening letter to a supervising Assistant U.S. Attorney.

==== Trial ====
Allegations against the leaders of OneTaste at trial are recapitulated in a government sentencing memorandum.

[H]einous acts of manipulation, coercion and exploitation that Daedone or her co-conspirators committed were the following:

- directing victims to serve as "handlers" for OneTaste's main investor, Reese Jones, including cooking for him, sexually servicing him each day and performing other labor;
- coercing victims to allow OneTaste clients and prospective customers to stroke their clitorises;
- compelling victims to stroke OneTaste clients and prospective customers' penises, and to have sex with them;
- directing that victims incur massive debt to pay for OneTaste courses and to continue to remain part of the OneTaste community; and
- directing victims to work around-the-clock – including menial and sexual labor – for little or no pay.

The victims performed these acts, and others, out of fear of serious harm, including physical, psychological and financial harm. Indeed, those who resisted were punished with negative employment consequences, shunning, sexual abuse and threats of physical violence, among other things. Nearly every trial witness described how Daedone and her coconspirators engaged in a campaign of indoctrination, grooming, isolation, manipulation, use of past trauma, monitoring, public shaming, relationship disruption, sexual abuse, physical exhaustion and financial harm to force their victims' labor.

The trial started on May 5, 2025. During the trial, former CTO Christopher Hubbard described OneTaste as a "sex cult", and stated that he and Daedone arranged BDSM activities for entrepreneur Reese Jones of Singularity University, involving Jones "either giving or receiving some form of sexual activity" with OneTaste members. The government notes that from 2007 and through 2011, Jones invested at least $800,000 in the company, and also subsidized Daedone's lifestyle.

A video entered into evidence suggested Daedone and OneTaste were indifferent as to consent, as Daedone claimed that rape could be "deflected" if the victim would "turn on 100 percent, because then there is nothing to rape."

A victim testified about an incident in which Cherwitz ordered her to undergo stroking by a third party in an orgasmic meditation demonstration witnessed by others. The victim testified to reluctantly agreeing to the third party's touching, but that Cherwitz herself then forcibly touched her without consent. When she did not provide an aroused response, Cherwitz berated and ridiculed the victim, calling her a "virus" infecting everyone with her bad ideas.

Several women who worked for OneTaste testified against Daedone and Cherwitz described instances of uncompensated and forced labor ranging from sex work with investors to menial domestic work including cooking and cleaning. Other work described as uncompensated and forced included "administrative and personal services; sales, marketing, pitching and recruitment work; video and website production; the operation of certain OneTaste locations; and the performance of physical labor to maintain OneTaste's properties."

==== Verdict ====
On June 9, 2025, the jury in the case found Daedone and Cherwitz guilty on federal forced labor charges.

Announcing the verdict, the Acting United States Attorney for the Eastern District of New York Joseph Nocella, Jr. said, "The jury's verdict has unmasked Daedone and Cherwitz for who they truly are: grifters who preyed on vulnerable victims by making empty promises of sexual empowerment and wellness only to manipulate them into performing labor and services for the defendants' benefit."

Lawyers for Daedone and Cherwitz told NPR that they intended to appeal the verdict to the United States Court of Appeals for the Second Circuit. Publicist Juda Engelmayer says the verdict "crosses a dangerous line — criminalizing freedom of religion, assembly, expression, and speech."

Following the verdict, Judge Gujarati ordered Daedone and Cherwitz remanded to the custody of the United States Marshals Service citing "witness intimidation" activities of OneTaste publicist Juda Engelmayer and OneTaste member Marcus Ratnathicam. Prosecutors noted that "an agent of the defendants' made threatening comments in the press, including writing an article that bore a swastika over the Department of Justice seal."

==== Sentencing ====
Forced labor conspiracy carries a maximum penalty of 20 years in prison. In December 2025 sentencing memoranda, prosecutors requested a 20-year sentence for Daedone, and a 14-year sentence for Cherwitz.

In an asset forfeiture motion, prosecutors argued that $12 million Nicole Daedone raised through the 2017 sale of her stake in OneTaste were proceeds of the criminal forced labor conspiracy, as were funds held in Daedone and Cherwitz's seized bank accounts. Judge Gujarati granted the motion on March 18, 2026.

On March 30, 2026 Judge Gujarati sentenced Daedone to 9 years imprisonment and Cherwitz to over 6 years. At the sentencing hearing, Judge Gujarati said that Daedone "does not appear to be remorseful".

As of March 2026 Daedone and Cherwitz are held at the Metropolitan Detention Center, Brooklyn while awaiting their permanent assignment. The Federal Bureau of Prisons lists Cherwitz as inmate register number 62735-510 and Daedone as inmate register number 63699-510.

==== Pursuit of executive clemency ====
In remarks to the New York Times, Daedone's lawyer Jennifer Bonjean has stated that she would "exhaust all avenues to get my client released" and "would of course be hopeful the [Trump] administration would look at the case." Ellen Huet wrote that Daedone befriended prison activist Topeka Sam, an activist with ties to White House "pardon czar" Alice Marie Johnson.

Attorney Alan Dershowitz told NBC News that he is lobbying the Trump administration to pardon the convicted OneTaste leaders.

== Continuing promotion of orgasmic meditation ==
As of March 2026 OneTaste (using the names "Eros Platform" and "Team Nicole") continues to hold events promoting orgasmic meditation with the image and likeness of Nicole Daedone and Rachel Cherwitz using social media, virtual reality headsets, computer-generated imagery and large language model text generation. One such event was a dinner promoted on Reason.com with tickets distributed by Eventbrite, featuring an avatar of Daedone. Others on the bill were Reason editor Elizabeth Nolan Brown, activist Topeka Sam and Massachusetts Institute of Technology professor Vivian Siegel.

The New York Times described the event as "emblematic of the nonstop campaign by Ms. Daedone, OneTaste and her fervent fans to burnish her image as a martyr for women's liberation." As part of the event, attendees were encouraged to donate to fund more dinners. Organizers gave donors of $100 Daedone's latest book as a premium. According to the Times article, the book's draft text was sent to followers "through the email system monitored by the Federal Bureau of Prisons". Bureau of Prisons policy describes prisoners' use of the Trust Fund Limited Inmate Computer System (TRULINCS) - Electronic Messaging system as a "privilege" that may be revoked.

== See also ==
- Neotantra – Western interpretation of Tantra
- One taste – Union of wisdom and emptiness
- Sex cult – Human trafficking for sexual purposes
