= Frank Parlato Jr. =

American investigative journalist and publisher (born 1955)

- Born: April 25, 1955 (age 71); Buffalo, New York, U.S.
- Occupation: Publisher
- Known for: Frank Report; The Lost Women of NXIVM; The Vow

Frank Parlato Jr. (born April 25, 1955) is an American publisher. He publishes the Frank Report, Artvoice, and The Niagara Falls Reporter. Parlato is widely credited with bringing attention to the NXIVM cult when he published the article "Branded Slaves and Master Raniere" on June 5, 2017.

== Work for NXIVM and federal tax case ==
In 2007, Parlato was hired by NXIVM as a publicist at the recommendations of his associates Steve Pigeon and Roger Stone. He was fired the following year. Documents Parlato shared with Vice indicate his fees (funded by NXIVM's prominent supporters Sara and Clare Bronfman) were contingent on damaging the personal and professional reputations of several enemies of NXIVM.

Following a four-year investigation, Parlato and business partner Chitra Selvaraj were federally indicted in the United States District Court for the Western District of New York in November 2015. Charges included fraud, money laundering, tax evasio, and conspiracy related to his management of the One Niagara Center in Niagara Falls, New York and defrauding the Seagram's heirs Sara and Clare Bronfman.

Following his indictment, Parlato began publishing blogs and stories about NXIVM and its founder Keith Raniere November 30, 2015. One of his first blogs on the site detailed his own indictment. The Frank Report subsequently published articles about NXIVM, DOS, Keith Raniere.

In 2018, prosecutors dropped the portion of the charges against him that related to defrauding Seagram's heirs. The Buffalo News, noting the changes in the superseding indictment from the United States District Court for the Western District of New York, reported that Seagram's heir Clare Bronfman went from being the accuser in Parlato's case to the accused when she was arrested in 2018.

Parlato's own case was still in pretrial phase in November 2021 when he was summoned by the federal court in Buffalo to appear following an alleged incident in Florida with a girlfriend involving "battery, false imprisonment, and witness tampering." The event was investigated as a potential bail violation. The arrest warrant was rescinded, and the court ordered Parlato to undergo an anger management evaluation.

Parlato and the United States government reached a plea deal on August 5, 2022. He plead guilty to the willful failure to file IRS Form 8300 (26 U.S.C. § 7203 and § 6050I) when he accepted a cash rent payment of $19,000 from commercial tenants of the One Niagara Building. The agreement also required Parlato to forfeit $1,000,000 originally seized during the investigation and to pay over $180,000 in restitution to the IRS. He was sentenced to five months of home detention.

== Media appearances ==
In 2019, Parlato was the lead investigator and consulting producer of the two-hour Investigation Discovery documentary The Lost Women of NXIVM. He also appeared in five episodes of HBO's docuseries The Vow: "Building Character," "Class 1 Data," "Blame & Responsibility," "The Wound," and "The Fall." Parlato also appeared in episode four of Seduced: Inside the NXIVM Cult. In both docuseries, Parlato is credited with helping women whom the cult called "slaves" escape and with ending the practice of human branding within the cult subgroup known as DOS.

In the Starz TV docuseries Seduced: Inside the NXIVM Cult, India Oxenberg credits Parlato for preventing "slaves" from being branded and required to have sex with NXIVM leader Keith Raniere. In the final episode of Seduced, "Exposed," Oxenberg said: "As soon as the [Frank Report] posts started coming up, there were a ton of questions and a lot of chatter. My slaves left immediately after that. And none of them had to complete the seduction assignment or be branded. That was a huge relief."

== Other reporting ==
Prior to his investigative work on NXIVM, Parlato, through The Niagara Falls Reporter, reported extensively on the no-bid contract enjoyed by the Maid of the Mist Steamboat Company while running boat cruises on the American and Canadian sides of the falls. He reported that the Niagara Parks Commission circumvented efforts by Ripley's Entertainment and Alcatraz Media to bid on the boat tour concession while secretly approving a 25-year renewal of the Maid of the Mist Steamboat Company's license, all while reducing its payment to the parks commission.

In a series of articles, Parlato revealed that on the New York side, Maid of the Mist Steamboat Co. was operating rent-free and that the company attempted to trademark the name Maid of the Mist, despite its use in tours and ferries since 1846. At one time, Parlato owned the One Niagara Building and took issue with having to pay taxes while the Seneca Nation, a sovereign tribe, did not. He accused the Senecas of "sucking the life out of Niagara Falls." Parlato sold the building and moved on, while the Senecas remained.

The stories were "hard-hitting and effected change." The Ontario Parliament ordered the cancellation of the Maid of the Mist lease and put the boat tour out to tender. The result was a winning bid by Hornblower Tours, which was $300 million higher than what Maid of the Mist would have paid had its lease not been canceled. Responding to critics who said he and his Niagara Falls Reporter publication had an unconventional style, Parlato told The Buffalo News: "We don't follow anybody's rules; we follow our own rules."

== Crisis communications work ==
Frank Parlato has been documented as working on behalf of several persons facing criminal charrges, often to attack the credibility of accusers. This has been characterized by one judge as "veering into witness intimidation."

=== One Taste ===
In 2018 Parlato began publishing a series of articles on sexual wellness company OneTaste, describing activities similar to NXIVM including the sex trafficking.

In June 2023, a grand jury in the United States District Court for the Eastern District of New York indicted OneTaste founder Nicole Daedone and former head of sales Rachel Cherwitz for the charge of conspiracy for forced labor (18 USC §§ 1589(a), 1589(b), 1594(b)).

Vanity Fair reports that Parlato reversed his stance on OneTaste after their publicist Juda Engelmayer "approached" him. In subsequent articles and public appearances, Parlato has defended OneTaste and Daedone while disparaging prosecutors, witnesses, and presiding Judge Diane Gujarati. According to Ellen Huet, Parlato's articles during the course of the trial called the witnesses “stupid,” “cowardly,” “crybabies,” “liars,” “regretful narcissists,” “losers,” and “imbeciles,” and mocked one accuser's weight in an article accompanied by photos of her clad in a bikini.

Huet and Vanity Fair reported that Parlato is compensated $20,000 per month by the OneTaste defense team.

On June 9, 2025, the jury in the trial of Daedone and Cherwitz voted to convict. Following the verdict, Judge Gujarati ordered Daedone and Cherwitz remanded while awaiting sentencing; she cited the publicity campaign "veering into witness intimidation" for her decision.

=== Jerry Sandusky ===
In 2026, news outlets reported Parlato has worked for the family of convicted pedophile Jerry Sandusky in his appeals.

Jerry Sandusky was a assistant coach for Penn State football from 1969 to 1999. In 1977, Sandusky founded The Second Mile, a non-profit charity serving Pennsylvania's underprivileged and at-risk youth.

On November 4, 2011, a grand jury that had been convened in September 2009, or earlier, indicted Sandusky on 40 counts of sex crimes against young boys. The indictment came after a three-year investigation that explored allegations of Sandusky having inappropriate contact with an underage boy over the course of four years, beginning when the boy was ten years old. The boy's parents reported the incident to police in 2009. The grand jury identified eight boys who had been singled out for sexual advances or sexual assaults by Sandusky, taking place from 1994 through 2009. At least 20 of the incidents allegedly took place while Sandusky was still employed at Penn State.

In In June 2012 Sandusky was convicted of multiple sex crimes committed against ten boys tied to The Second Mile. He has maintained his innocence, and has filed multiple motions seeking post-conviction relief in 2013 and 2023; both were unsuccessful.

In August 2026, Frank Parlato announced that one of several victims of Sandusky would recant his accusations. Parlato claims that "Everything the public thinks it knows about Jerry Sandusky is the opposite of the truth," and that Sandusky is innocent.

On the eve of the court date scheduled to hear the recantation, Sandusky instead ordered his attorneys to cancel the hearing. Sandusky claimed it was because he would not receive a fair hearing in Pennsylvania's state court system. Sandusky announced he would instead pursue an appeal in federal court. The Office of the Pennsylvania Attorney General called the recantation "highly suspect".

=== Alexander brothers ===
In November 2026, the New York Times reported that they had authenticated business records suggesting Frank Parlato accepted payments to write stories to aid the defense of team of Oren, Alon, and Tal Alexander by attacking one of their accusers. The brothers were accused, and ultimately convicted, of sex trafficking

The New York Times reported that in June 2025, the Alexander brothers retained the crisis communications services of Juda Engelmayer, with whom Parlato has previously worked. In 2025, Parlato wrote a story on his blog suggesting that the initial accuser of the Alexander brothers, Kate Whiteman, was criminally extorting the brothers. Whiteman was subsequently found dead in Australia in January 2026, prior to the Alexander brothers trial. The cause of Whiteman's death was not released, though determined not to be suspicious.

In November 2026, the Times followed up their previous coverage of Engelmayer's work for the Alexander brothers after obtaining invoices in which Engelmayer requesting disbursement of money for sympathetic coverage of the Alexander brothers. This included a request for $10,000 to pay Frank Parlato, addressed to Oren Alexander's defense attorney Jason Goldman. Although Goldman and Engelmayer both confirmed the invoice as authentic, Goldman told the Times that he could not recall paying Parlato, and Parlato would not answer whether he had been paid. In an emailed comment to the Times, Parlato denied that he was influenced by payments, telling the Times that “Nobody tells me what to write.”
