= The Lost Women of NXIVM =

2019 American documentary TV series

- Genre: Documentary
- Country of origin: United States
- Original language: English
- No. of episodes: 1

Production
- Running time: 86 minutes

Original release
- Network: Investigation Discovery
- Release: December 8, 2019

The Lost Women of NXIVM is a two-hour documentary premiered on Investigation Discovery on December 8, 2019. Former NXIVM publicist Frank Parlato, who first revealed that NXIVM was branding women, takes a deep dive to answer the questions surrounding the tragic deaths and mysterious disappearances of five women who all had connections to NXIVM. The documentary exploring what happened to the women who were members of personality cult of imprisoned racketeer and sex offender Keith Raniere, who either vanished or died in mysterious circumstances. The documentary stars narrator Michelle Wong, investigator and whistleblower Frank Parlato, former NXIVM consultant Roger Stone, and archive footage of NXIVM founder Keith Raniere.

A number of Raniere's alleged lovers suffered untimely deaths. According to that program, a woman who lived with Raniere and developed bladder cancer submitted a hair sample that reportedly revealed the evidence of dangerous levels of bismuth and barium. Gina Hutchinson was found dead of a gunshot wound to the head. Kristin Snyder disappeared and was last seen at a NXIVM event. Live-in girlfriends Barbara Jeske and Pam Cafritz both died from what was diagnosed as cancer at the time but is alleged to have actually been subtle poisoning. Raniere's partner Kristin Keeffe survived cervical cancer. In 2009, Raniere was filmed claiming, "I've had people killed because of my beliefs."
