= Singularity Group =

American business consultancy company

Singularity Education Group
- Industry: Education
- Founder: Peter Diamandis and Ray Kurzweil
- Headquarters: Santa Clara, California
- Brands: Singularity University, SingularityU, SU Ventures, Futurism News (formerly), Uncommon Partners Labs
- Number of employees: <250
- Website: www.su.org

Singularity Education Group (using the public names Singularity Group, Singularity University or SingularityU) is an American company that offers executive educational programs, a business incubator, and business consultancy services.

== History ==
Singularity University was announced at a TED talk in 2009 by Ray Kurzweil, who co-founded the company with Peter Diamandis. Diamandis was the university’s first chairman. It was founded as a nonprofit and initially offered an annual 10-week summer program called the Graduate Studies Program (GSP) aimed at people who want to understand how they can use technology to tackle global challenges. Its original Corporate founding partners and sponsors included Google, Nokia, Autodesk, the X Prize Foundation, ePlanet Ventures, the Kauffman Foundation, and Genentech. Google subsequently ended its grant of $1.5 million annually.

Singularity University began the process for conversion to a for-profit benefit corporation. In 2013, the new for-profit corporation incorporated as "Singularity Education Group" and acquired "Singularity University" as its trade name. Also in 2013, Diamandis founded Abundance360, an invitation-only program to bring together people interested in exponential and life extension technologies. Abundance360 is now a program within Singularity University. In 2018, Singularity announced a $32 million Series B investment round.

In 2018, faculty reported frustration about the company's focus on profit. The next year, it acquired Futurism, moved the headquarters from the NASA Research Park at NASA Ames to Santa Clara, California, and added new Country Partner franchises in Brazil and Australia. Futurism was sold in 2021 to Recurrent Ventures. In 2022, Talespin acquired Pioneer Adaptive Learning Platform. Aaron Vaccaro has been the president of Singularity University since 2023.

Although the company uses the word "university" in its branding, it is not an accredited university and has no academic programs or accreditation. Between 2024 and 2025, Singularity Group organized and participated in several international summits. Singularity Summit Spain was held in Madrid in November 2024. Other events were held in South Africa, Brazil, and India. The summit in India was attended by 120 B Tech, MBA, and MCA students with a focus on AI, robotics, and biotechnology.

== Executive Program ==
The Executive Program is a series of five-day training programs that focus on how topics relating to technology and its impacts on business.

=== Global Impact Competition ===
In 2016, SingularityU The Netherlands organized a Global Impact Competition for Dutch entrepreneurs. Danny Wagemans, a 21-year-old nanophysics student, won the first prize to participate in the 10-week Global Solutions Program. He demonstrated how clean water and energy can be derived from urine by combining a microbial fuel cell and a graphene filter in a water bottle.

== Singularity Hub ==
Singularity Hub is a science and tech media website published by Singularity University. It was founded in 2008 with the mission of "providing news coverage of sci/tech breakthroughs that are rapidly changing human abilities, health, and society". It was acquired by Singularity University in 2012, to make content produced by Singularity University more accessible.

In March 2018, Singularity Hub released 695 articles via Creative Commons license CC BY-ND 4.0.

== SU Labs ==
SU Labs is a seed accelerator by Singularity University, targeting startups that aim to "change the lives of a billion people."

In 2011, a Singularity University group launched Matternet, a startup that aims to harness drone technology to ship goods in developing countries that lack highway infrastructure. Other startups from SU are the peer-to-peer car-sharing service Getaround, and BioMine, which uses mining technologies to extract value from electronic waste.

== Controversies ==
=== 2018 Bloomberg Businessweek report ===
A 2018 investigative report by Bloomberg Businessweek found many issues with the organization, including an alleged sexual harassment of a student by a teacher, aiding of theft by an executive, and allegations of discrimination. It also noted that Naveen Jain, an early member of the company, was convicted of insider trading in 2003.

=== COVID denialism ===
In February 2021, MIT Technology Review reported that a group owned by Singularity had held a "mostly maskless" event in Santa Monica in violation of the local stay-at-home order that became a superspreading event. The event was led by Singularity co-founder Peter Diamandis. In a follow-up article, MIT Technology Review reported that after COVID-19 started spreading among attendees, Diamandis tried to sell them "fraudulent" treatments that a professor of law and medicine at Stanford University called "quackery". The superspreading event was covered widely by publications including the New York Times, the Washington Post, and the Los Angeles Times.

=== Ties to OneTaste ===
A 2013 article in Gawker noted that Singularity founder Ray Kurzweil and associate founder Reese Jones each endorsed Nicole Daedone's sexual wellness company OneTaste. The article quoted Daedone boasting that her company had "the blessing of Ray Kurzweil" and documented Jones appearing and giving a presentation at a OneTaste conference. It also noted that Daedone was Jones's romantic partner.

In 2025, Daedone was convicted in the United States District Court for the Eastern District of New York of forced labor conspiracy. The trial revealed that Jones kept the company afloat for several years, providing at least $800,000 from 2007 through 2011. In return, Daedone procured the sexual services of OneTaste subordinates (euphemistically called "handlers") for Jones. Jones himself was not criminally charged.
