= Isabel Losada =

British Author of narrative non-fiction

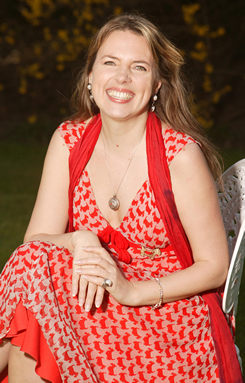
- Isabel Losada, British writer
- Born: United States
- Occupation: Author
- Writing career
- Period: 1999 –
- Genre: Narrative non-fiction
- Notable works: The Battersea Park Road to Enlightenment; For Tibet With Love
- Website: www.isabellosada.com

Isabel Losada is a British author of narrative non-fiction. Her most recent full-length books (The Battersea Park Road to Paradise, Sensation and The Joyful Environmentalist) combine humour with a serious look at their subject matters and are true-life accounts of her own experiences. She has one daughter and lives in Battersea, London.

== Books ==
=== New Habits ===
New Habits (Hodder) examines happiness among Church of England nuns. When a friend announced that she was going to become a nun (or more correctly a 'religious'), the author decided to interview ten more young women who were making the same choice to join a range of different Christian communities ranging from enclosed contemplative communities to Franciscan communities. The interviews cover the women's feelings about the vows of poverty, celibacy and obedience as well as describing other details of the daily life of a religious sister.

The book is included in the Diocesan Directors of Ordinands recommended reading list for those exploring vocation.

=== The Battersea Park Road to Enlightenment ===
The Battersea Park Road to Enlightenment (Bloomsbury) is an exploration of the subject of happiness. In it she tries out many of the 'New Age' courses available in the UK that claim to offer routes to inner peace and personal fulfilment. The book explores Insight Seminars, tai chi, a retreat in an Anglican convent, astrology, Tantric sexuality, Co-Dependent's Anonymous, colonic irrigation, rebirthing-breathwork, past life regression with Roger Woolger various forms of massage including stone massage and Kahuna Hawaiian massage, neuro-linguistic programming, an anger management workshop, and a workshop on angels with William Bloom. The book was chosen as Radio 4's Book of the Week and Isabel performed it herself for the series. The book went on to become a bestseller in the UK and has been translated into 15 languages including Japanese and Russian. Oprah Radio host Mehmet Oz called the book "a fantastically cool endeavour".

=== For Tibet, with Love. A Beginner's Guide to Changing the World ===
For Tibet, with Love. A Beginner's Guide to Changing the World (Bloomsbury) explores what one person can do to make a difference, in this case to the sinicization of Tibet. The book was republished in 2005 reversing the title and subtitle so became 'A Beginner's Guide to Changing the World' (which was also the title of the US edition). This second UK edition also had a different ISBN. In 2010 Bloomsbury brought out a new third edition, with a new preface under the original title. In this book Isabel travels to Lhasa explores how individuals and groups can use the media to raise awareness and influence public opinion and finally travels to Dharamsala to interview the 14th Dalai Lama.

=== Men ===
Men (Virgin / Random House) is a humorous examination of the widely experienced sociological phenomenon of there being many more single and available women over the age of 40 in our cities than men and answers the question "Where are all the interesting and available men?" The book considers the many factors that have produced this discrepancy including an interview with Simon Baron-Cohen, which details the differences between the male and the female brain.

=== The Battersea Park Road to Paradise ===
The Battersea Park Road to Paradise, (Five Adventures in Being and Doing) (Watkins) explores Feng Shui, Anthony Robbins, Vipassana, Advaita and Shamanism was published in 2011. This book begins by exploring the impact of our environment and ends with an exploration of the nature of consciousness itself through the teacher Mooji and ends with an experience of taking Ayawaska with the Ashaninka in the Amazonian Rainforest.

=== Sensation ===
Sensation (Watkins) is Losada's account of a year spent exploring the subject of sex between heterosexual couples, and in particular what makes sex into good sex in long term and loving relationships. The research for the book involved participation in various courses, couple workshops, women-only weekends and attending the first international conference on Orgasmic Meditation. The book, part memoir and part manifesto in the cause for better relationships between men and women, has been praised for its honesty about a subject often shrouded in fear and shame despite the so-called sexual revolution. Sensation was also chosen as the 'Non-Fiction Book of the Month' by The Bookseller magazine.

=== The Joyful Environmentalist ===
The Joyful Environmentalist. How to Practice Without Preaching (Watkins) is Losada's collection of stories, reflections and ideas about the steps that an individual can take to help save the environment and the planet. As well as tips to reduce the use of plastic, switching to renewable energy, ethical banking, sustainable clothing choices, and gardening for biodiversity, Losada recounts her personal experiences of planting native trees in the Highlands of Scotland, playing Samba drums with Extinction Rebellion and visiting Knepp Wildland (a pioneering rewilding project). The environmental and political activist George Monbiot is quoted as saying about the book, "this is the joy we need in our lives".

A short extract from the book, which lists ten recommended trees and shrubs for the garden to attract birds, was reproduced in the Gardens Illustrated magazine.

The book was awarded "Best overall sustainability book for 2022". According to the reviewers, it takes the reader on Losada's "own inspiring, and often hilarious, eco journey ... it's a genuinely enjoyable read for anyone who is feeling eco anxious".

In advance of the 2022 United Nations Climate Change Conference (COP27), Losada draws on her ideas in the book to offer some "specific actions" that "fellow environmentalists" can take.

== Awards and nominations ==
In 2019 Isabel was awarded 'Author of the Year' by Kindred Spirit magazine. The magazine selected Isabel for the body of her work in the Mind Body Spirit sector and the award was secured by her popularity in a reader vote.

In 2024, she was nominated as a "climate hero" by Down to Earth readers of The Guardian newspaper.

== Talks and journalism ==
Isabel gives comedy talks and presentations about her work, particularly at literary and arts festivals such as, for example, the Brighton Festival, The Edinburgh International Book Festival, Ways With Words (Dartington) and the South Asian Literature Festival. As part of the 2011 SW11 Literary Festival she was "Author in Residence", which also involved spending nine days sat in the window of a Waterstone's bookshop! She has been interviewed about her work on BBC Radio 4's Midweek, Start the Week, Woman's Hour (several times) and Excess Baggage as well as for Jeremy Vine and Steve Wright on BBC Radio 2.

She writes regularly for newspapers and journals, and the occasional blog. A short article on the "importance of knowing nothing" was published by the prestigious Royal Society of Arts in 2011.

In May 2022 she gave a talk at the Hay Festival on The Joyful Environmentalist: How to Practise Without Preaching.

== Tibet ==
She has been a supporter of and active campaigner for the Tibetan cause for many years, and a founding member of Act for Tibet. In 2003, during the writing of the book For Tibet, with Love , she organised a stunt in Trafalgar Square — a banner depicting the Dalai Lama was unfurled from the top of Nelson's Column and a pro-Tibet campaigner made a parachute jump. Her list of 'top 10' books about the Dalai Lama and Tibet appeared in the Guardian.

== The Battersea Literature Festival ==
In 2014 Isabel was invited to become the artistic director of The Battersea Literature Festival. A Festival that takes place in the first two weeks of September in various locations in Battersea which include The Battersea Arts Centre, The Battersea Power Station and local bookshops. Isabel described being given this opportunity as 'The dream job for an author between books.'

== Patronage ==
Isabel is the Patron of the Charity 'Centrepieces'.

== Bibliography ==
- New Habits: Today's Women Who Choose to Become Nuns (1999) ISBN 0-340-72238-X
- Battersea Park Road to Enlightenment (2001) ISBN 0-7475-5318-1
- For Tibet, with Love. A Beginner's Guide to Changing the World (2004) ISBN 0-7475-7285-2
- A Beginner's Guide to Changing the World: For Tibet, with Love (2005) ISBN 0-7475-8118-5
- 100 Reasons to Be Glad (2006) ISBN 1-84024-548-4
- Men! Where the **** Are They? (2007) ISBN 978-0-7535-1276-0
- The Battersea Park Road to Paradise (April 2011) ISBN 978-1-907486-39-5
- Sensation (2017) ISBN 978-1786780935
- The Joyful Environmentalist: How to Practise without Preaching (2020) ISBN 978-1786784704
