= Orgasm Inc: The Story of OneTaste =

Netflix documentary

- Promotional poster
- Directed by: Sarah Gibson
- Written by: Marissa Díaz
- Produced by: Sarah Gibson & Marissa Díaz
- Starring: Frank Fu; Yves Gore
- Production company: Netflix
- Distributed by: Netflix
- Release date: 5 November 2022
- Running time: 89 minutes
- Country: United States
- Language: English

Orgasm Inc: The Story of OneTaste is a 2022 Netflix documentary directed by Sarah Gibson that explores the rise and controversies surrounding the sexual wellness company OneTaste. The company, known for promoting the "orgasmic meditation" (OM) practice, has faced legal disputes and public scrutiny. According to Rotten Tomatoes, five of the film's six professional reviews are favorable. Former OneTaste members who alleged that the film used "misappropriated" footage sued to stop the film's release, but dropped the lawsuit after the film was released with their faces obscured.

== Background ==
OneTaste was founded by Nicole Daedone in the early 2000s, with the goal of promoting orgasmic meditation, a practice in which one participant stimulates another's clitoris for 15 minutes while engaging in mindfulness. The company marketed OM as a method to improve sexual well-being and emotional healing.

In 2018, a Bloomberg Businessweek article raised concerns about the company's business practices, including allegations of financial exploitation and manipulation, which became central to the controversies surrounding OneTaste and featured in the documentary.

The documentary was released on Netflix on November 5, 2022.

== Synopsis ==
The documentary traces the growth of OneTaste, highlighting the initial appeal of orgasmic meditation to people seeking emotional and sexual fulfillment. It paints a picture of a wellness startup, exploration of sexuality, and people suffering from loneliness and disconnection feeling loved, connected, and belonging. Then it takes a quick turn, showing the alleged dark side of OneTaste, with allegations by former participants who say they were manipulated and pressured into sexual acts to benefit the company financially.

The film also discusses an FBI investigation prompted by a 2018 Bloomberg Businessweek article. A central part of the narrative is the story of Ayries Blanck, whose experiences are documented through journals allegedly written by her sister, Autymn Blanck. These journals describe alleged coercion and abuse by OneTaste staff.

== Reception ==
The Rotten Tomatoes review aggregator recorded an 83% positive rating for the film, based on six reviews, with the critical consensus summarized as: "This investigative documentary employs access to 15 years of never-before-seen footage and interviews with former members to pull back the curtain on the organization and its controversial, enigmatic leader." According to Common Sense Media, the film directors "allow Daedone's upbeat lectures to speak for themselves but gradually an array of her well-spoken financial and psychological victims offer another view, casting a retrospective sinister shadow on Daedone's goals".

== Litigation ==
Fourteen former OneTaste members sued Netflix on November 2, 2022, in an attempt to block the film's release, claiming that much of the footage in the film was "misappropriated" by a former OneTaste employee. Nearly 500 people signed a petition asking Netflix not to use the stolen footage, which the signers said they never consented to let Netflix use. The judge denied the motion. The plaintiffs withdrew their lawsuit on November 7 after the documentary was released with their faces blurred or out of frame.
