= Keith Raniere =

American cult founder and convicted felon (born 1960)

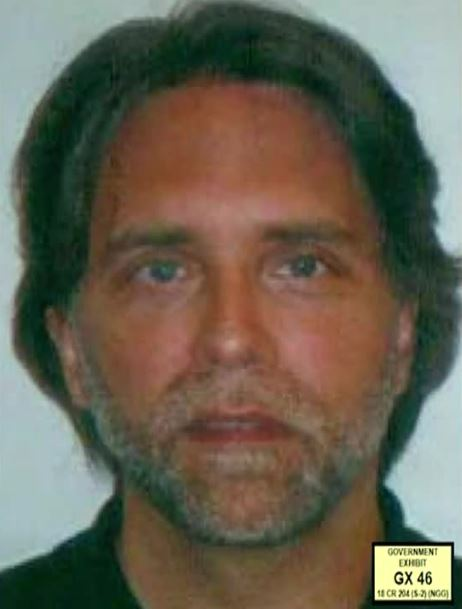
- Raniere's 2019 mugshot
- Born: Keith Allen Raniere; August 26, 1960 (age 66); New York City, U.S.
- Education: Rensselaer Polytechnic Institute
- Known for: Founder of NXIVM
- Status: Incarcerated
- Convictions: Sex trafficking; Attempted sex trafficking; Sex trafficking conspiracy; Racketeering conspiracy; Forced labor conspiracy; Wire fraud conspiracy; Racketeering
- Penalty: 120 years imprisonment; $1.75 million fine; $15,000 assessment pursuant to Justice for Victims of Trafficking Act of 2015; $3.5 million restitution to 21 victims pursuant to the Trafficking Victims Protection Act and Mandatory Victim Restitution Act

Details
- Victims: 21–25+
- Date apprehended: March 26, 2018
- Imprisoned at: FCI Butner I

Keith Allen Raniere (/rænˈjɛəri/ ran-YAIR-ee; born August 26, 1960) is an American cult leader who was convicted of a pattern of racketeering activity, including human trafficking, sex offenses, and fraud. Raniere co-founded NXIVM, a purported self-help multi-level marketing company offering personal development seminars and headquartered in Albany, New York. Operating from 1998 to 2018, NXIVM had 700 members at its height, including celebrities and the wealthy. Within NXIVM, Raniere was referred to as "Vanguard".

Scholars in the fields of religious studies, law, and sociology describe NXIVM as a cult. Mental health professionals and cult experts such as Rick Alan Ross, Diane Benscoter, and Steve Hassan have called Raniere a cult leader who manipulates and exerts coercive control over his followers. Multiple women have said they were sexually abused by Raniere, including three who have reported being underage at the time of the abuse.

In 2018, reports of abuse related to a secret society within NXIVM, known as "DOS" or "the Vow", led to the arrests of Raniere and five other NXIVM associates. On June 19, 2019, a jury in the Eastern District of New York convicted Raniere of racketeering for a pattern of crimes, including the sexual exploitation of a child, sex trafficking of women, and conspiracy to commit forced labor. The court received more than 100 victim impact statements detailing the harm Raniere caused. On October 27, 2020, Judge Nicholas Garaufis sentenced Raniere to 120 years incarceration and a $1.75 million fine.

== Early life ==
Raniere was born on August 26, 1960, in Brooklyn, New York City, the only child of James Raniere (1932–2020), an advertising executive, and Vera Oschypko (1931–1978), a ballroom-dancing instructor. When Raniere was five years old, his family relocated to Suffern, New York. His parents separated when he was eight.

Raniere attended Suffern High School for ninth grade before transferring to Rockland Country Day School. He graduated in June 1978, two months prior to his eighteenth birthday. As an adult, Raniere reported that he read Isaac Asimov's mind control-themed work Second Foundation at age 12 and credited the novel with inspiring his work in NXIVM. In 1982, Raniere graduated from Rensselaer Polytechnic Institute with a 2.26 GPA, barely passing and failing many classes. He was employed as a computer programmer for the New York State Division of Parole.

Describing a conversation with Raniere's father, his former partner, Barbara Bouchey, recalled, "[James] said ... [they] told Keith about how gifted and how intelligent he was. And he said it was almost like a switch went off. And suddenly, overnight, [Raniere] turned into ... Jesus Christ ... [thinking] he was superior and better than everybody, like he was a deity. [James] said it was that [snaps] dramatic and that profound; he said it went right to [Raniere's] head." According to Bouchey, Raniere's mother also reported hearing "dozens of young girls ... calling the house, and [that Raniere] ... was telling every single girl the same thing: 'I love you. You're the special one. You're important. You are the only one in my life, and I love you.' And Vera says, 'He's saying this to all these girls. He's clearly lying 'cause all of them are not special!'"

In June 1988, the Albany Times Union profiled Raniere, reporting on his membership in the Mega Society after he achieved a high score on the MEGA test, an unsupervised, 48-question test published in the April 1985 issue of Omni magazine. Although the MEGA test has been widely criticized as not having been properly validated, the 1989 edition of the Guinness Book of World Records (the last edition to include a category for highest IQ) described the Mega Society as "the most exclusive ultrahigh IQ society", and the 1989 Australian edition identified Raniere, Marilyn vos Savant, and Eric Hart as the highest-scoring members of the group.

== Career ==
Throughout the 1980s, Raniere was involved with the multi-level marketing company Amway. In 1990, he founded a multi-level marketing company of his own, Consumers' Buyline Inc. (CBI), a buying club that offered discounts in exchange for recruitment. At a CBI pitch meeting, Raniere met Toni Natalie, who subsequently became a top seller for the organization, along with her then-husband. Natalie and her son later moved to Clifton Park, New York, to be near Raniere; her marriage ended shortly thereafter. Natalie and Raniere dated for the next eight years.

In 1993, CBI began to decline, and regulators in twenty states launched investigations into the entity. New York State filed a lawsuit alleging that CBI was a pyramid scheme. In 1994, Raniere created National Health Network, a multi-level seller of vitamins; that business failed three years later. In 1996, Raniere signed a consent order with New York State resolving the case against CBI; without admitting wrongdoing, he agreed to pay a $40,000 fine. He ultimately only paid $9,000 to the state; despite having claimed a multimillion-dollar net worth, he said he was unable to pay the remainder. The consent order also permanently barred Raniere from "promoting, offering or granting participation in a chain distribution scheme".

== NXIVM: Executive Success Programs ==
=== Foundation ===
In 1998, Natalie met Nancy Salzman, a nurse and a practitioner of hypnotism and neuro-linguistic programming. Natalie recalled:

Nancy said, "You're so wonderful; how can I help you?" So I said, "Well, you can help me with my boyfriend." He had grandiose ideas and his hours were becoming erratic again ... She listened and she said, "Oh that's easy, I can help you. He's a sociopath ..." They met, and four days later she came out with the glazed eyes and gave me the, "You don't know who he is", and I was like, "Wow, there goes another one."

Raniere and Salzman founded Executive Success Programs (ESP), a personal-development company offering a range of techniques aimed at self-improvement. A few years later, the program was rebranded under the name NXIVM. Raniere "adopted the title 'Vanguard' from a favorite arcade game in which the destruction of one's enemies increased one's own power." Much of NXIVM was influenced by the teachings of Ayn Rand, one of Raniere's favorite authors. In 2002, Raniere and Salzman succeeded in recruiting members of the influential Bronfman family, heirs to the multibillion-dollar Seagram fortune. Sara Bronfman initially became involved, followed by sister Clare Bronfman. Their father, Edgar Bronfman Sr., took a NXIVM course the following year.

NXIVM teachings drew upon diverse influences, including Ayn Rand ("parasites"), L. Ron Hubbard ("suppressives"), Milton Erickson's hypnosis, Isaac Asimov's science fiction, Rudolf Steiner, Tony Robbins and neuro-linguistic programming. NXIVM incorporated elements of multi-level marketing and practices from judo, with colored cloth for rank and bowing.

=== Forbes exposé ===
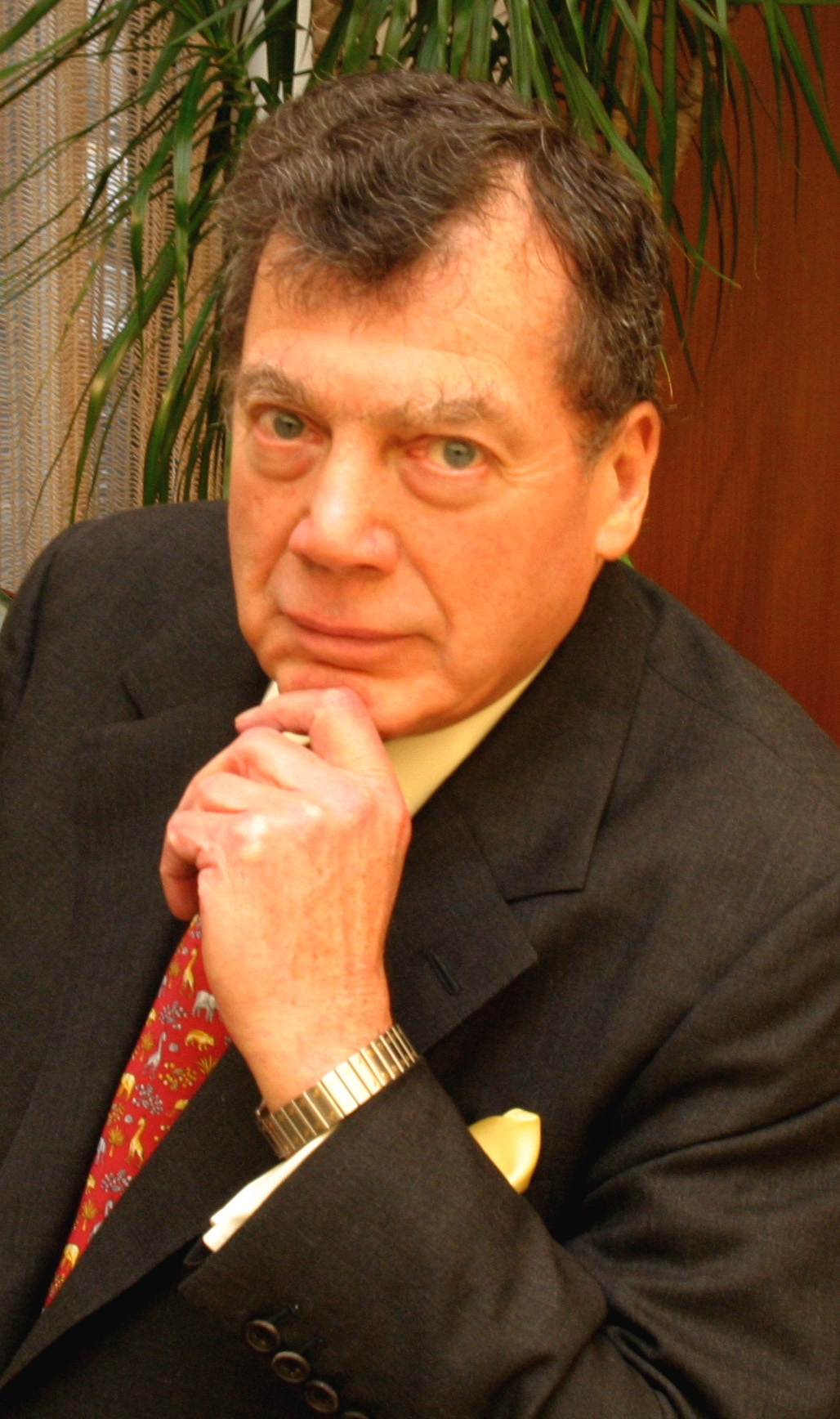
In 2003, billionaire Edgar Bronfman Sr. took a NXIVM course at the encouragement of his daughters. Later that year, he denounced the group as a "cult" in a quote he gave to Forbes magazine.

In October 2003, Raniere was featured, cloaked in shadows, on the cover of Forbes magazine, accompanied by the appellation "The World's Strangest Executive Coach". The "devastating" cover story, penned by Michael Freedman and entitled "Cult of Personality", was later described as "a gold mine of previously unpublished information". It discussed Raniere's title of "Vanguard"; detailed the failure of CBI; and included a quote from Edgar Bronfman accusing the organization of being a cult.

Vanity Fair subsequently reported on the Forbes article's impact within the group: "People at NXIVM were stunned. Expecting a positive story, the top ranks had spoken to Forbes, including Raniere, Salzman, and Sara Bronfman. What upset them above all were Edgar Bronfman's remarks." According to Vanity Fair, the article was a turning point in Raniere's relationship with Edgar: one anonymous source said that the article's publication "was when Edgar Bronfman became NXIVM's enemy". A witness at Raniere's trial later testified that Bronfman's computer was compromised and his emails monitored by group members for a period of years.

=== Commodities trades ===
From January 2005 until late 2007, Raniere lost nearly $70 million in commodities trading. Bouchey spent $1.6 million covering losses of commodities trades which Raniere had made in her name. Raniere suggested to Clare Bronfman that the losses were due to market manipulation by her father. Beginning in August 2005, the Bronfman sisters covered the losses, ultimately using $150 million of their own funds in support of Raniere and his organization.

=== Collaborations with the Dalai Lama ===
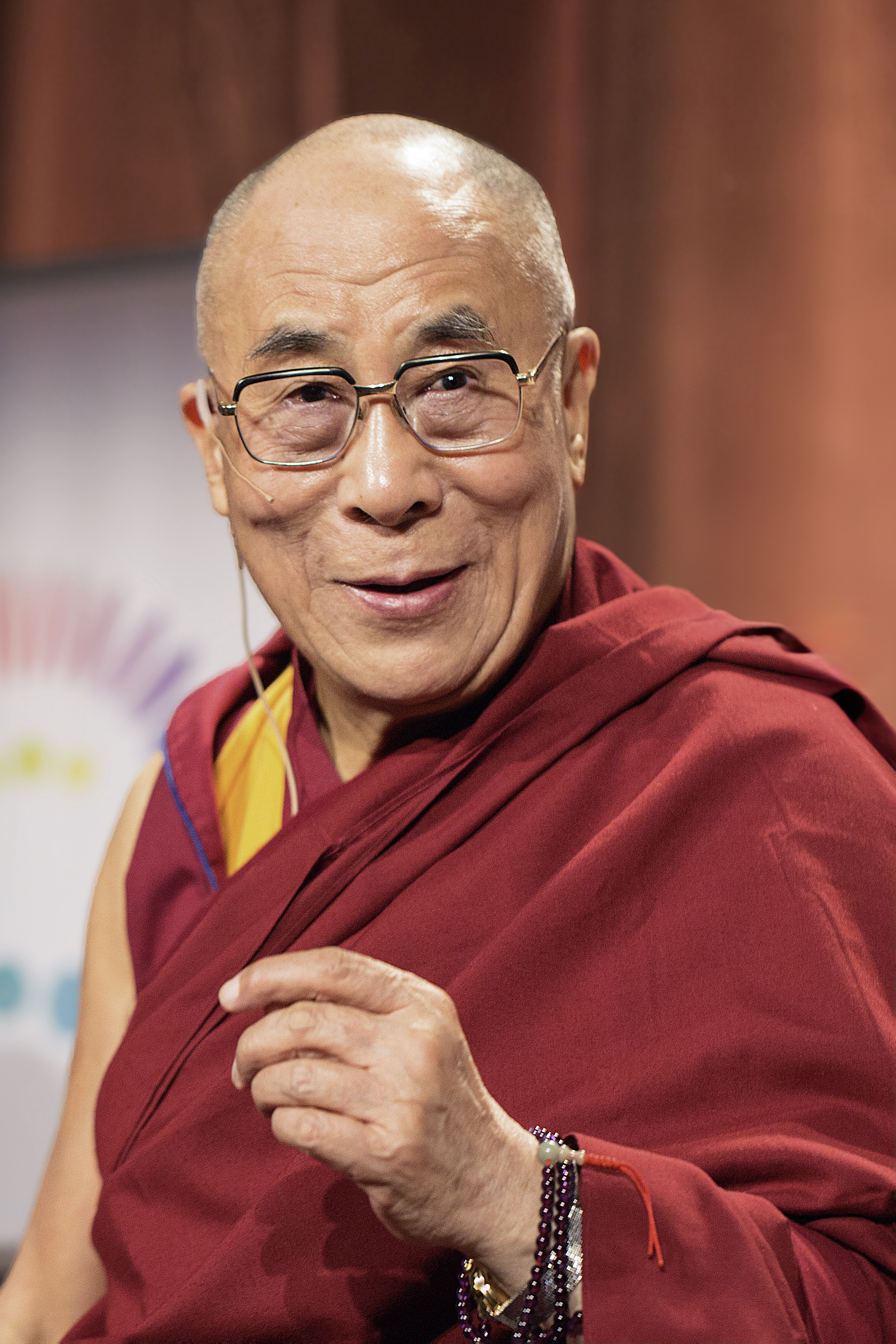
In 2009, the 14th Dalai Lama appeared at a NXIVM event.

Eager to distance themselves from negative allegations, NXIVM members sought the endorsement of the 14th Dalai Lama, spending $2 million on the project. On May 6, 2009, the Dalai Lama traveled to Albany to give a talk; during the event, he presented Raniere with a white scarf onstage. The Dalai Lama additionally wrote the foreword to the book The Sphinx and Thelxiepeia, which Raniere co-authored in 2009. The prior year, Raniere had co-authored his first book, Odin and The Sphinx. Eight years later, it was revealed that, in 2009, Sara Bronfman had a sexual relationship with Lama Tenzin Dhonden, the Dalai Lama's gatekeeper, who arranged the appearance, and who, as a monk, had taken a vow of celibacy. Amid accusations of corruption, Dhonden was replaced.

=== Mass resignations and public allegations ===
In 2009, a group of Raniere's associates called the "NXIVM Nine"—which included his former partner, Barbara Bouchey—broke with the organization, citing "concerns about unethical practices and the alleged abuse of his leadership status to sexually manipulate women in the organization". In November 2010, Vanity Fair published an article, "The Heiresses and the Cult", in which Natalie, another former partner of Raniere, recalled that he "had insisted she keep the body of her dead puppy in her garage freezer and look at it daily". In a 2010 Times Union article, former NXIVM coaches characterized students as "prey" for Raniere to satisfy either his gambling or sexual proclivities.

External videos
- 2009 discussion between Bouchey and Raniere: Partial transcript KR: You don't have the experience of leadership. You don't have the experience of preserving people's lives with what you say. And the truth of the matter is – BB: Well, in a way neither do you – KR: Yes I do. BB: No you don't, because the only company before this was Consumers Buyline and that, in my understanding, fell apart within a few years ... or was on the downhill after a couple years when you got sued or whatever it was. KR: That's not ... Well .. Here's the thing ... I've been shot at because of my beliefs ... I have had to make choices: should I have body guards? Should I have them armed or not? I've had people killed ... because of my beliefs and their beliefs.

=== Departure of Kristin Keeffe ===
Kristin Keeffe was a longtime partner of Raniere and the mother of his first child. In 2010, it was reported that Raniere had ordered that the child be kept away from peers and that he was being cared for by nannies speaking five different languages. In February 2014, Keeffe broke up with Raniere and left NXIVM. After she fled the Albany area with her son, an email bearing her name explained: "I have full sole legal custody of Gaelyn. Keith was experimenting on him. I had to get Gaelyn away." Keeffe publicly described Raniere as "dangerous".

In 2015, Keeffe publicly alleged that Raniere directed the Canadian investigative firm Canaprobe to obtain financial information on six federal judges and a United States senator as well as a reporter, an editor, and the publisher of the Times Union. That same year, Keeffe further alleged that Raniere had planned to lure his critics to Mexico with an invitation to an anti-cult conference; once there, the critics were to be arrested on false charges by order of a local judge who had been bribed. Keeffe stated at Raniere's sentencing that he had never paid child support for their son.

=== Patent-infringement litigation ===
In 2015, Raniere sued AT&T and Microsoft, alleging they had infringed on his patents. The following year, the case was dismissed with prejudice. The trial court ruled that Raniere's "conduct throughout this litigation, culminating in his untruthful testimony at the hearing on the motion to dismiss, demonstrates a pattern of obfuscation and bad faith". Raniere was sanctioned and ordered to pay $450,000 in attorneys' fees.

== History of sexual abuse and assault cases ==
Public accusations of sexually predatory behavior and inappropriate relationships with minors began trailing Raniere in the early 2010s. Soon after his arrest in 2018, prosecutors opposed bail, writing that Raniere had "a decades-long history of abusing women and girls." At his trial, prosecutors introduced evidence that Raniere held views approving sexual assault, child sexual abuse, and incest.

=== Toni Natalie ===
Raniere's eight-year relationship with Toni Natalie ended in 1999. She later claimed to have been the victim of harassment. In a January 2003 ruling, federal judge Robert Littlefield implied Raniere was using a legal suit to harass his former partner, writing, "This matter smacks of a jilted fellow's attempt at revenge or retaliation against his former girlfriend, with many attempts at tripping her up along the way." In 2011, Natalie filed documents in federal court alleging that she had been repeatedly raped by Raniere.

=== Times Union exposé ===
In 2012, the Times Union reported that Raniere had three sexual relationships with girls under the age of consent during the 1980s and 1990s; Times Union reporters spoke to the girls and their families. One of the victims, who spoke out on condition of anonymity, said that she met Raniere in 1990, when she was aged 12 and he was aged 30. Raniere offered to tutor the girl, whose mother worked for CBI, and one of his live-in partners, Pamela Cafritz, hired her to walk their dog and encouraged her to visit their townhouse. The woman said that the tutoring sessions were a pretext for sexual encounters and that she and Raniere had over sixty such encounters over a course of months, ending around 1991. In 1993 she received counseling for victims of sex abuse and filed a report with the New York State Police against Raniere. The complaint was not forwarded to prosecutors because she had declined to wear a wire to obtain a confession from Raniere.

=== Abuse of sisters from Monterrey ===
In the 2019 criminal case against Raniere, prosecutors alleged that, starting in 2002, Raniere gained a Svengali-like control over a Mexican family who all moved from Monterrey to the NXIVM community in Albany. The three sisters in this family eventually became sexual partners of Raniere. The eldest, Marianna, is the mother of Raniere's second biological child. The middle child, Daniela, testified that she was groomed as a minor and began a sexual relationship with Raniere days after her 18th birthday. The youngest, Camila, stated that Raniere began sexually abusing her in 2005, when she was aged 15. The prosecution established that Raniere impregnated each sister at various times and compelled them to obtain abortions. In addition, Daniela testified that Cafritz coached each sister to refuse to answer questions about paternity to prevent his abuse from becoming known to any nurse who might be a mandated reporter.

==== Daniela ====
According to Daniela, who testified for the prosecution at Raniere's trial, Raniere claimed that he had "mystical" powers and could help people grow spiritually and "fix disintegrations" through sex. The sisters were strongly discouraged from discussing their sexual relationships with Raniere, even between each other.

Beginning in 2010, Daniela was confined to a bedroom for two years in her family home on the pretext that she had stolen money. Daniela maintained her captivity began when she told Raniere she had romantic feelings for another man. Raniere accused her of an "ethical breach" and assigned Lauren Salzman (Nancy Salzman’s daughter) to help her "learn from her mistakes". Daniela described the spartan conditions of the room, consisting of blacked-out windows with only a mattress on the floor, a pen, and paper. Daniela was only allowed to speak to Salzman; other family members were instructed to shun her. This alleged confinement ended in 2012, after she almost attempted suicide, but instead decided to leave her family home. After escaping her captivity, Daniela went to a volleyball game to confront Raniere, who attempted to hide. She was later escorted out of the NXIVM community and was left at the U.S.–Mexico border with less than $80 and no personal documents.

Salzman corroborated Daniela's account at the trial, testifying that her efforts to leave the room (including cleaning her room, exercising, and writing daily letters to Raniere) were all rejected, and that Raniere had told Salzman to ignore a letter sent by Daniela pleading to be let out, brushing it off as "a tantrum". Salzman admitted that she and others were "incredibly abusive" to Daniela and that "[n]othing [Daniela] could do was the right thing".

==== Camila ====
At Raniere's trial, prosecutors accused Raniere of the sexual exploitation of Daniela's underage sister Camila, narrating it through Daniela's testimony, hospital records, transcripts of Raniere's communication with Camila, and sexually explicit photos of Camila found in his home. Prosecutors also introduced WhatsApp messages between Raniere and Camila, which showed that Raniere considered her as his "slave" and tasked her with finding more sex slaves, which Raniere calls "successors" and expresses a preference for women shorter than him, younger, and virgins.

While Camila did not testify during the trial, she confirmed the sexual abuse at Raniere's sentencing in her victim impact statement. Camila said she met Raniere at age 13 and began a sexual relationship with Raniere when she was aged 15, which lasted for twelve years. The abusive relationship with Raniere continued into her adulthood, where his control and demands led to her developing an eating disorder, self-harming, and attempting suicide.

=== Suspicious deaths ===
- In 1984, a 24-year-old Raniere seduced and statutorily raped 15-year-old Gina Melita after the two met in a theater group. When their relationship ended, Melita introduced him to her friend Gina Hutchinson, only aged 14, whom he also statutorily raped. When her sister, Heidi Hutchinson, found Raniere climbing into Gina's bedroom window and confronted the pair, Raniere told her that Hutchinson was a "Buddhist goddess meant to be with him". Heidi recalled that, during the late 1980s, Raniere was fascinated by Amway, Scientology, and neuro-linguistic programming. Gina dropped out of school and continued her relationship with Raniere, working for a time at CBI. On October 11, 2002, the 33-year-old Gina was found dead of a gunshot wound to her head on the grounds of the Karma Triyana Dharmachakra Buddhist monastery in Woodstock, New York, an apparent suicide. According to former NXIVM publicist Frank Parlato, "one source close to Raniere, who knew Gina, said she observed Raniere discussing with Gina various methods people use to commit suicide. Sometimes, he would send her images of suicide for her to comment on. He took her to movies with scenes or themes of suicide. He would sometimes pose the question—'Is suicide always wrong? When could it be the right thing to do?'" Allegedly, after Raniere learned that Hutchinson had another boyfriend, he "reportedly said she must ascend to the level of the goddess by leaving her body."
- Kristin Snyder was a 35-year-old environmental consultant who, in November 2002, paid $7,000 to enroll in a sixteen-day ESP course conducted in Anchorage, Alaska, hosted by Salzman. The following January, Snyder traveled to Albany to visit Raniere and other NXIVM leaders. Snyder's mother recalled that her daughter "had come to believe she was responsible for the Columbia shuttle disaster" and "thought Keith was incredible". Snyder signed up for a second ESP course in Anchorage. On February 6, 2003, the tenth day of the second seminar, she reportedly began claiming to be pregnant with Raniere's child, a claim allegedly corroborated by Clare Bronfman. Clifford recalled: "I was told [by a NXIVM instructor] not to bring her to the hospital. That's what makes me feel really bad." Snyder was last seen leaving this session of the course. Her vehicle was discovered two days later in Seward, Alaska, 120 miles from Anchorage. Police recovered a note that read: "I attended a course called Executive Success Programs ... based out of Anchorage, AK, and Albany, NY. I was brainwashed, and my emotional center of the brain was killed/turned off. I still have feeling in my external skin, but my internal organs are rotting ... I am sorry life [sic]; I didn't know I was already dead. May we persist into the future." A separate page added: "No need to search for my body." A witness at Raniere's trial testified that, after Snyder disappeared, Raniere paid $24,000 to obtain the password to her email account.
- 63-year-old Barbara Jeske died from brain cancer on September 3, 2014. A business graduate of Michigan State University, Jeske was one of the earliest ESP recruiters in 1999 and became Raniere's top lieutenant in NXIVM. In 2014 she was diagnosed with a brain tumor, but was told by Raniere that she instead had carpal tunnel syndrome and was instructed not to seek medical attention.
- On November 7, 2016, another senior NXIVM member, 57-year-old Pamela Cafritz, died of renal cancer. Both Jeske and Cafritz were diagnosed with cancer while living with Raniere in his Halfmoon, New York, condominium. Two other female NXIVM members were diagnosed with cancer while residing in the same residence, although both survived. A sample of hair from one of the women, who survived bladder cancer, showed that she had "significantly higher" levels of carcinogenic "heavy metals" such as bismuth and barium. After Cafritz' death, Raniere and his co-conspirators used her identity and her credit card, charging over $300,000. In 2009, Raniere was filmed claiming: "I've had people killed because of my beliefs—or because of their beliefs."

== DOS: secret "slaves" and branding ==
=== Creation, membership, and collateral ===
In 2015, Raniere created a secret subgroup within NXIVM called "DOS", an acronym for "Dominus Obsequious Sororium". DOS operated with levels of women "slaves" headed by "masters". Slaves were expected to recruit slaves of their own, becoming masters themselves. Slaves owed service not only to their own masters but also to masters above them in the DOS pyramid. An estimated 150 women joined DOS. Raniere was the only male in DOS and sat at the top of the pyramid as the "grandmaster".

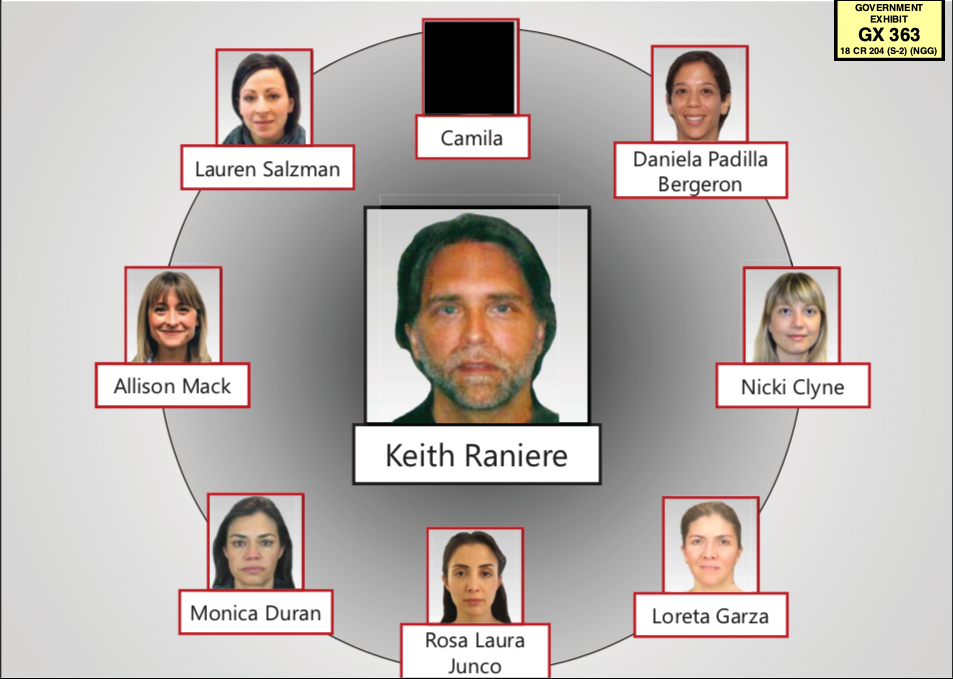
Prosecution exhibit depicting Raniere's first-line masters

Raniere initially recruited eight women to join DOS, including Allison Mack, Nicki Clyne and Lauren Salzman, who became his inner-circle members and DOS "first-line masters". DOS masters recruited new members by telling them they were joining a women-only organization that would empower them, with Raniere's status as the leader of DOS concealed.

Raniere maintained command and control over DOS members by collecting "collateral"—which included highly damaging personal information, sexually explicit photos or videos, and rights to personal assets—and relied on his inner-circle members to carry out his orders and build the DOS pyramid group. Women were required to provide collateral before joining DOS and continue to give new collateral every month after joining it. Slaves were told that their collateral could be released for any number of reasons, including if they left DOS, spoke publicly about DOS, or repeatedly failed DOS obligations or assignments.

=== Mental, physical, and sexual abuse of members ===
Raniere tasked his inner-circle members with various DOS projects and devised assignments for DOS slaves, including instructions for seduction assignments in which DOS masters implicitly or expressly directed their slaves to engage in sexual activity with Raniere. The assignments later served as the basis for Raniere's indictment and convictions for sex trafficking and attempted sex trafficking.

Raniere encouraged DOS masters to use demeaning and derogatory language and racial slurs to humiliate DOS slaves. Slaves were required to provide free labor for their masters and were severely sleep-deprived from forced participation in "readiness drills" which required them to respond to their masters at any time of the day or night. DOS members were subject to corporal punishment, which included being forced to hold painful poses, stand barefoot in the snow, take cold showers, and whip each other with a strap. FBI agent Michael Lever reported that DOS slaves were forced to adhere to extremely restrictive diets to satisfy Raniere's preference for "exceptionally thin" women. The extreme diet caused women to stop menstruating and their hair to fall out. Slaves were also ordered to remain celibate and stop removing their pubic hair.

=== Branding of members ===
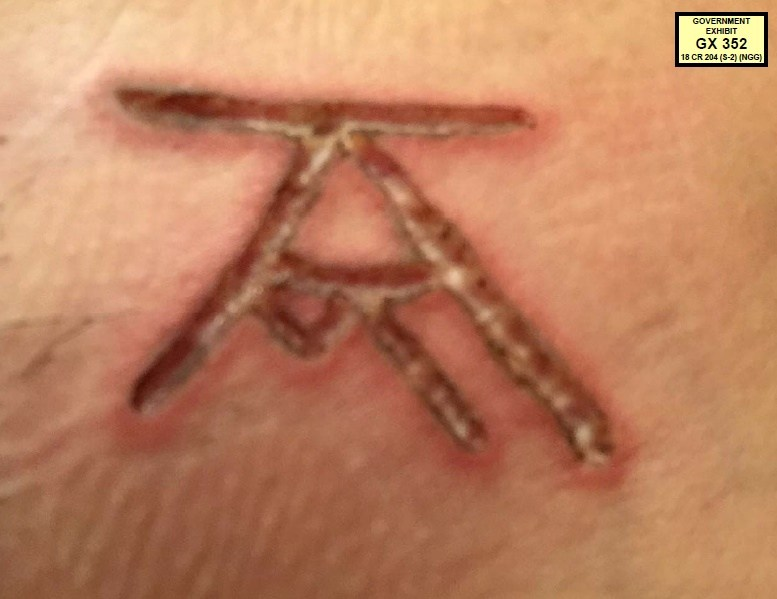
Prosecution exhibit: a photo of the DOS brand, which consisted of Raniere's initials K.A.R.

DOS members were branded in their pelvic regions with a symbol that, unbeknownst to them, incorporated Raniere's initials. Some slaves were told the brand stood for the elements. Only Raniere's inner-circle members knew the brand was his initials. At Raniere's trial, prosecutors introduced a recording of a private meeting in 2016 with inner-circle members where Raniere stated, "The monogram as it is right now is very directly related to my initials." The group discussed how to obscure that fact.

The DOS branding ritual followed a script created by Raniere: slaves were required to be fully naked, with the ceremonies filmed and used as more collateral on the DOS slaves. In a recorded conversation between Raniere and Mack discussing the branding, Raniere said, "The person should probably ask to be branded. They should probably say that before they're held down, so it doesn't seem like they're being coerced." NXIVM member Danielle Roberts performed the branding of DOS members using a cauterizing pen. The New York State Department of Health later revoked Roberts' medical license following an investigation into the branding.

=== The purpose and aim of DOS ===
At Raniere's trial, Lauren Salzman stated that the DOS pyramid had four levels of slaves, each reporting to their master on the level above them, and all of them ultimately accountable to Raniere, the grandmaster. Salzman testified that the overriding emphasis of DOS was to venerate Raniere and foster an atmosphere of total obedience and secrecy. DOS members communicated using encrypted phone applications like Telegram and Signal, and members' identities were not always known to one another. DOS members were encouraged to recruit people of power and influence with DOS sororities across the country. Salzman also testified that she was helping Raniere edit his DOS manifesto that enforced the master-slave relationships. Excerpts from the book included: "The best slave derives the highest pleasure from being her Master's ultimate tool" and, "Your sole highest desire must be to further your Master from whom all good things come and are related."

=== Exposure ===
On June 5, 2017, Frank Parlato reported the existence of DOS and the practice of human branding. On October 17, 2017, The New York Times published a story detailing DOS abuses, including the requirement of slaves to provide collateral.

Following the NYT piece, Raniere sent a draft position statement to DOS first-line masters, writing that women who had been branded were being shamed by a "misogynistic strike" and that DOS was an "autonomous" organization, "separate and distinct from NXIVM" and that he had "little knowledge or authority in the issue". In a separate letter to NXIVM members he wrote, "I feel it is important to clarify the sorority is not part of NXIVM and that I am not associated with the group."

== Arrest, trial, and conviction ==
In the wake of the Times piece, Raniere and members of his inner circle fled to Mexico. A search warrant was issued for his email account on January 18, 2018. The FBI filed a sealed criminal complaint and obtained a warrant for Raniere's arrest from the United States District Court for the Eastern District of New York on February 14. On March 26, Mexican Federal Police located Raniere in a luxury villa outside Puerto Vallarta, arresting and deporting him. Salzman later testified that when the police arrived, she and Raniere barricaded themselves in the master suite, with Raniere attempting to hide in a walk-in closet.

=== Pre-trial proceedings ===
American authorities took custody of Raniere and presented him in federal court in Fort Worth, Texas, and later transferred him to custody at the Metropolitan Detention Center (MDC) in New York City. The unsealed complaint accused Raniere of a variety of crimes related to DOS, including sex trafficking, conspiracy for sex trafficking, and conspiracy to commit forced labor. The complaint alleged that at least one woman was coerced into sex with Raniere, who forced DOS members to undergo the branding ritual alleged by former DOS members. United States Attorney Richard Donoghue stated that Raniere "created a secret society of women with whom he had sex and had branded with his initials, coercing them with the threat of releasing their highly personal information and taking their assets."

From his 2018 arraignment in the United States District Court for the Eastern District of New York through his sentencing in 2021, prosecutors sought to keep Raniere remanded to the MDC. Raniere's attorneys petitioned for his release on bail, while prosecutors opposed the petition, citing Raniere's inconsistent answers about his income and his previous flight to Mexico.

=== United States v. Keith Raniere trial ===
Video of U.S. Attorney Richard Donoghue announcing the conviction of Keith Raniere outside the Theodore Roosevelt United States Courthouse on June 19, 2019

Raniere's federal racketeering trial began on May 7, 2019. The charged acts included:

- Sexual exploitation of Camila as a minor and possession of child sexual abuse material depicting her;
- Sex trafficking and forced labor of "Nicole";
- Attempted sex trafficking of "Jay";
- Identity theft against Edgar Bronfman, James Loperfido, Ashana Chenoa, "Marianna", and Pam Cafritz;
- Subjecting Daniela to "document servitude" for labor and services;
- Conspiracy to alter records for use in an official proceeding;
- Sex trafficking conspiracy;
- Forced labor conspiracy;
- Racketeering conspiracy, and;
- Wire fraud conspiracy.

In opening statements, prosecutors contended that Raniere was not a mentor but a "predator" who targeted people looking to improve their lives and took advantage of them once he gained their trust. The defense argued that Raniere was akin to a strict sports coach, emphasizing that "[t]his [was] something these people signed up for." Prosecution witnesses included NXIVM member Lauren Salzman; filmmaker Mark Vicente; victims "Sylvie", "Daniela", "Jay", and "Nicole"; and cult educator Rick Alan Ross. The defense rested without calling any witnesses.

At closing arguments, prosecutor Moira Penza argued that the organization Raniere founded was secretly a sex cult set up like a pyramid scheme and that Raniere was "a con man" and "a crime boss with no limits and no checks on his power" who "tapped into a never-ending flow of women and money". Defense attorney Marc Agnifilo, conversely, said that Raniere's interactions were all consensual, saying that those who left the group were not subject to punishment. Agnifilo concluded Raniere was an eccentric who lived an alternative polyamorous lifestyle with consenting adults, noting that their "lifestyles aren't criminal". On June 19, 2019, the jury found Raniere guilty on all charges after five hours of deliberation.

== Post-conviction ==
While awaiting sentencing, Raniere filed two motions for a new trial: a March 2020 motion claimed witnesses perjured themselves, then an October 2020 motion claimed that prosecutors had intimidated witnesses. Judge Garaufis denied both motions.

=== Loyalists' activities at Metropolitan Detention Complex ===
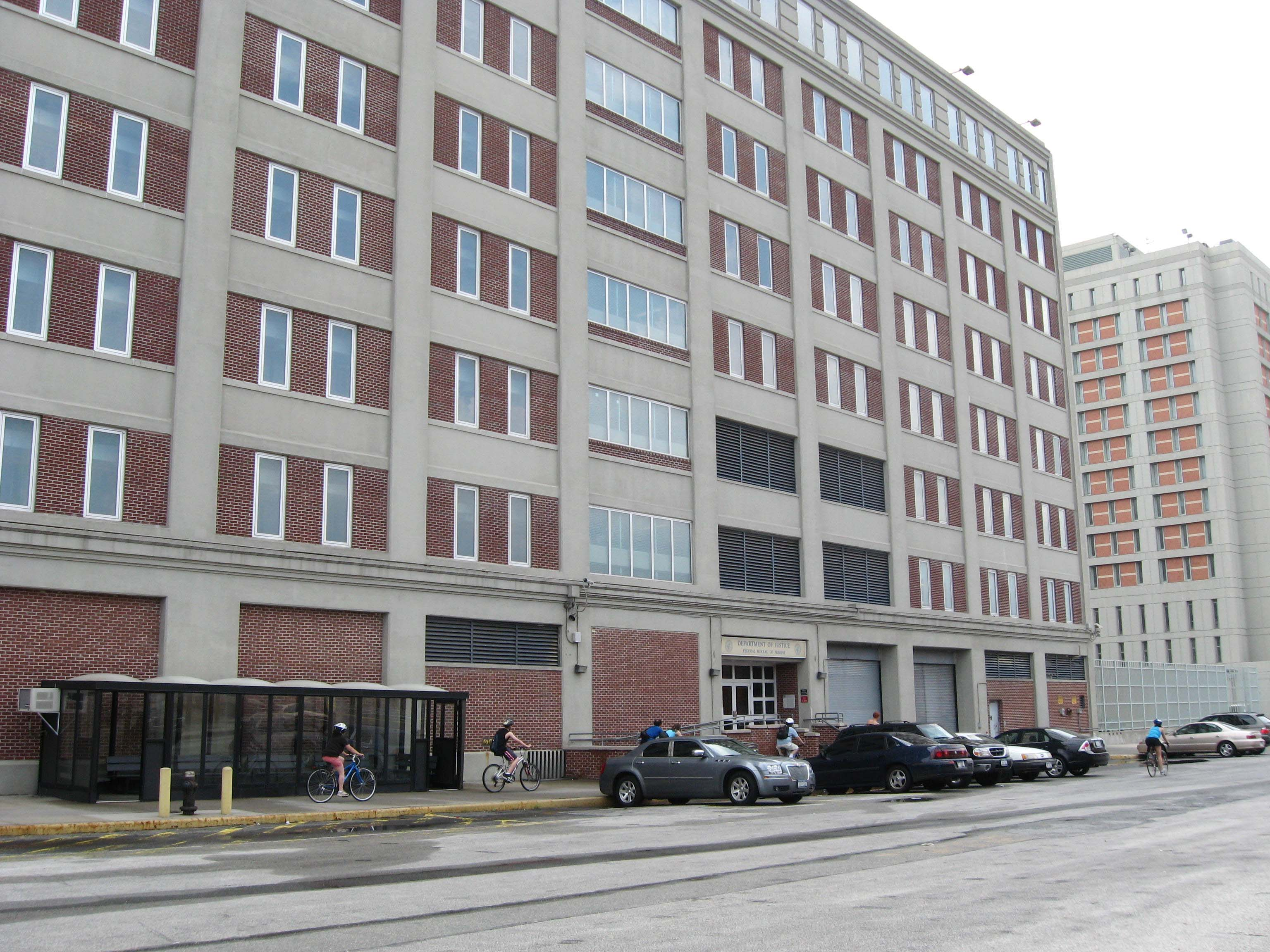
The Metropolitan Detention Center, Brooklyn, where Keith Raniere was jailed during his trial. According to Federal Bureau of Prisons, Raniere demanded "a group of women to show up regularly and dance provocatively for inmates to view through their cell windows".

Convicted in June 2019, the 2020 outbreak of the COVID-19 pandemic and its impact on prisons delayed Raniere's sentencing until over a year later. He remained in the MDC awaiting sentencing. While there, he began communicating with a supporter, Suneel Chakravorty, who recorded some of their conversations. These recordings were released through a website as a podcast called Raniere Speaks, with copyright held by Dialogue Productions, LLC. Raniere was subsequently forbidden by MDC officials from contacting Chakravorty.

In the summer of 2020, with the pandemic preventing in-person visitation to the MDC, Raniere's remaining followers, including Clyne, began assembling to dance near the jail. Though they initially claimed to be entertaining all of the detainees, they were seen with a sign addressed to "Kay Rose", a name sharing Raniere's initials. The group began calling itself "The Forgotten Ones" and "We Are As You". Former NXIVM member turned prosecution witness Mark Vicente dismissed the group as a "cover movement" for support of Raniere.

A July 16, 2020, intelligence analysis memorandum from the Bureau of Prisons Counter Terrorism Unit stated that Raniere instructed Chakravorty to get more women to dance "erotically" outside the MDC. In response, authorities moved Raniere to another unit to keep the dancers out of his line of sight. A frustrated Raniere instructed his followers to help get him moved back by ingratiating themselves to prison staff, including offering coffee and donuts as they left their shifts.

=== Sentencing, restitution, and appeal ===
Ahead of his sentencing, prosecutors submitted a number of Raniere's communications and disciplinary issues in prison as evidence of remorselessness and of his continued control over his followers. The communications included Raniere instructing his followers to have Alan Dershowitz, the attorney who successfully negotiated a non-prosecution agreement for the late Jeffrey Epstein, speak on his behalf; Dershowitz did not comment on the matter. Prosecutors also submitted documentation that Raniere and Chakravorty used a false name and "burner phone" to evade detection, with Raniere instructing Chakravorty to "get scrutiny" on Judge Nicholas Garaufis, explaining that "the judge needs to know he's being watched".

As sentencing proceeded, federal prosecutors asked for life imprisonment for the severity of Raniere's crimes and his lack of remorse—they said he showed "a complete lack of acceptance of responsibility for his crimes" and argued that he would continue to commit crimes if released. Prosecutors said Raniere has stayed in touch with members of NXIVM since his conviction, casting himself in emails as a victim and encouraging them to keep the group alive. Prosecutors argued in their sentencing memorandum that Raniere "concealed his abuse behind the smoke screen of his supposed 'personal growth' programs—a charade he continues to this day".

On October 27, 2020, Judge Nicholas Garaufis sentenced Raniere to 120 years in prison and fined him $1.75 million. To begin serving his 120-year sentence, Raniere was first transferred to United States Penitentiary, Lewisburg, a medium-security penitentiary in Pennsylvania, and then to the United States Penitentiary, Tucson (USP Tucson) in Arizona. The Arizona facility is the sole facility in the federal prison system that is both specially designated for sex offenders and also at the maximum-security level. As of 2026, he is incarcerated at FCI Butner I.

On July 20, 2021, Raniere made a virtual appearance from his USP Tucson prison cell for a hearing on restitution, the last remaining material from the trial. Imprisoned co-defendant Clare Bronfman paid attorneys Marc Fernich and Jeffrey Lichtman to represent him. Judge Garaufis ruled that twenty-one victims of Raniere should receive a total of $3.46 million in restitution. This included payments to cover the cost removing the DOS-related scarification, ongoing mental health care, and making labor trafficking victims whole. Garaufis's order also stated that "all lower-ranking DOS members are statutorily entitled to the return of their collateral" and ordered Raniere "to effectuate that return to the fullest extent practicable". Due to Fifth Amendment concerns, this order was stayed until sixty days after a ruling on Raniere's appeal to the United States Court of Appeals for the Second Circuit.

Raniere gave notice of appeal of both his conviction and sentence to the Court of Appeals for the Second Circuit in November 2020. Oral arguments were heard on May 3, 2022. The Circuit upheld the decision and rejected the appeal on December 9, 2022. Judge José A. Cabranes wrote, "Raniere has failed to persuade us that there is insufficient evidence to sustain his convictions."

=== Edmondson v. Raniere lawsuit ===
In January 2020, Raniere and several other NXIVM leaders were named as defendants in a civil lawsuit filed in federal court by eighty former NXIVM members. The lawsuit details allegations of fraud and abuse and charges NXIVM with being a pyramid scheme, exploitation of its recruits, conducting illegal human experiments, and making it "physically and psychologically difficult, and in some cases impossible, to leave the coercive community." This case is ongoing as of March 2024.

=== Prison lawsuits ===
In May 2022, Raniere filed suit against the U.S. Department of Justice and Federal Bureau of Prisons, alleging that his civil rights are violated as a prisoner in USP Tucson. Raniere sought an injunction allowing visitation and phone calls from Chakravorty, who he claims is a paralegal working on his appeals. The Department of Justice, Bureau of Prisons, and authorities at USP Tucson moved to deny the injunction, on grounds that Chakravorty is not a paralegal but merely "an ardent former ESP and NXIVM coach with whom [Raniere] is banned from associating." Judge Raner Collins granted the Department of Justice's motion to dismiss the suit on grounds that Raniere failed to exhaust administrative remedies in line with the Prison Litigation Reform Act, and for insufficient service of process.

== In the media ==
- In 2018, Josh Bloch, a CBC Radio producer and childhood friend of actress and former NXIVM member Sarah Edmondson, compiled an investigative podcast series about NXIVM titled Uncover: Escaping NXIVM.
- In 2019, TV network Investigation Discovery released a documentary titled The Lost Women of NXIVM. In that film, Frank Parlato examines the deaths of four women who had connections to NXIVM and Raniere. According to that program, a woman who lived with Raniere and developed bladder cancer submitted a hair sample that reportedly revealed the evidence of dangerous levels of bismuth and barium.
- Seduced: Inside the NXIVM Cult is a four-part documentary series that follows the story of India Oxenberg, her time at NXIVM. The series premiered on Starz on October 18, 2020.
- HBO released a docuseries about NXIVM titled The Vow. The documentary series premiered on August 23, 2020. Musician Nick Jonas subsequently appeared as Raniere on Saturday Night Live, satirizing footage featured in The Vow. Season 2 of The Vow was released on October 17, 2022, and details Raniere's court trial.
