= Wilbert Baranco =

American musician (1909–1983)

Wilbert Baranco (15 April 1909 – October 1983) was an American jazz pianist and bandleader.

Baranco played with Curtis Mosby in the early 1930s and then put together his own bands in the 1930s and 1940s, including several military bands during World War II. He recorded with Ernie Andrews in Los Angeles in 1945, and led a trio which included Charles Mingus around that time as well. He served as the accompanist for Dinah Washington when she sang with the Lucky Thompson All-Stars. Some time after the war he put together an ensemble known as Wilbert Baranco & His Rhythm Bombardiers, composed of former servicemen; this group recorded with, among others, Vic Dickenson, Dizzy Gillespie, and Willie "The Lion" Smith. He also recorded in the 1940s with Jackie Kelson and Snooky Young. He became a music teacher after the 1940s. He is also the father of Lafayette Morehouse founder Victor Baranco.

== Discography ==
- Groovin High with Gerald Wilson, Jimmy Mundy (Hep, 1977)
- Dinah Washington, Mellow Mama (Delmark, 1992)
