= Diane Gujarati =

American judge (born 1969)

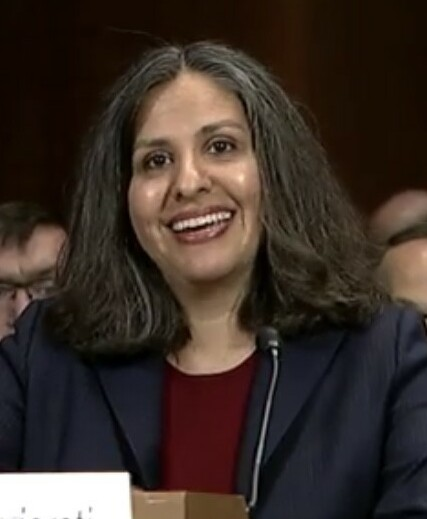

Judge of the United States District Court for the Eastern District of New York
- Incumbent
- Assumed office September 18, 2020
- Appointed by: Donald Trump
- Preceded by: John Gleeson

Personal details
- Born: 1969 (age 56–57) New York City, U.S.
- Education: Barnard College (BA); Yale University (JD)

Diane Gujarati (born in 1969) is a United States district judge of the United States District Court for the Eastern District of New York.

== Biography ==
Gujarati's father was an economics professor and her mother was a high school social studies teacher. She received her Bachelor of Arts degree, summa cum laude, from Barnard College in 1990 and her Juris Doctor from Yale Law School in 1995. She began her legal career as a law clerk to Judge John M. Walker Jr. of the United States Court of Appeals for the Second Circuit from 1995 to 1996.

After completing her clerkship, Gujarati was an associate in the New York City office of Davis Polk & Wardwell from 1996 to 1999. She was an Assistant United States Attorney for the Southern District of New York from 1999 to 2020, where she served as Deputy Chief of the Appeals Unit in the Office's Criminal Division from 2006 to 2008. She was Deputy Chief of the Office's White Plains Division from 2008 to 2010, and then Chief from 2010 to 2012. From 2012 to 2020, Gujarati was the Deputy Chief of the Criminal Division of the United States Attorney's Office for the Southern District of New York. She previously served as an adjunct professor of clinical law at New York University School of Law from 2015 to 2018.

== Federal judicial service ==
=== Expired nomination to district court under Obama ===
On September 13, 2016, President Barack Obama nominated Gujarati to serve as a United States district judge of the United States District Court for the Eastern District of New York, to the seat vacated by Judge John Gleeson, who resigned on March 9, 2016. She was recommended to Obama by U.S. Senator Kirsten Gillibrand. Gujarati's nomination drew no controversy, but it occurred late in Obama's presidency and was not acted upon. Her nomination expired on January 3, 2017, with the end of the 114th Congress.

=== Renomination to district court under Trump ===
In August 2017, Gujarati was one of several candidates pitched to U.S. senators from New York Chuck Schumer and Kirsten Gillibrand by the White House as part of a bipartisan package of judicial candidates for vacancies on the federal courts in New York. On May 10, 2018, President Donald Trump announced his intent to nominate Gujarati to serve as a United States district judge of the United States District Court for the Eastern District of New York. On May 15, 2018, her nomination was sent to the Senate. On August 1, 2018, a hearing on her nomination was held before the Senate Judiciary Committee. On September 13, 2018, her nomination was reported out of committee by a 21–0 vote.

On January 3, 2019, her nomination was returned to the President under Rule XXXI, Paragraph 6 of the Senate. On April 8, 2019, President Trump announced the renomination of Gujarati to the district court. On May 21, 2019, her nomination was sent to the Senate, she was renominated to the same seat. On June 20, 2019, her nomination was reported out of committee by voice vote. On September 9, 2020, the Senate invoked cloture on her nomination by a 94–2 vote. On September 10, 2020, her nomination was confirmed by a 99–0 vote, with Senator Kamala Harris, who was on the campaign trail for her vice-presidential bid as the Democratic nominee, being the only Senator not to vote. She received her judicial commission on September 18, 2020. Upon taking office, Gujarati became the first Indian American to serve as an Article III federal judge in New York.

=== Notable cases ===
The OneTaste case (United States v. Cherwitz and Daedone, 23-CR-146) is among the more high-profile cases overseen by Judge Gujarati, given its media attention and legal complexity. OneTaste, a wellness company founded by Nicole Daedone, promoted "orgasmic meditation," which involves stroking a woman's or man's genitals for a period of 15 minutes. The company faced allegations of misconduct following a 2018 Bloomberg article. In June 2023, Daedone and former head of sales Rachel Cherwitz were indicted on charges of conspiracy to commit forced labor, with allegations spanning from 2006 to 2018, including economic, emotional, and psychological abuse, as well as coercion and intimidation.

Defense attorneys have accused the FBI, and particularly FBI Special Agent Elliot McGinnis, of misconduct including mishandling evidence, improperly accessing privileged materials, and pressuring witnesses. They also raised concerns about the alleged fabrication of evidence and the timing of Netflix's Orgasm Inc. documentary, which aired shortly before the indictment. In March 2025, prosecutors dropped key evidence from the trial involving journals featured in the documentary, saying they no longer believed portions of the handwritten journals are authentic.

Judge Gujarati denied defense motions for dismissal or evidentiary hearings, allowing the case to proceed toward trial, which began in May 2025.

== Personal life ==
Gujarati has been married since 2000 to Charles Chesnut, who was a web site builder as of their wedding, and who as of 2024 is a vice president at Integral, a communications firm.

Legal offices
Preceded by John Gleeson	Judge of the United States District Court for the Eastern District of New York; 2020–present	Incumbent
