= The Niagara Reporter =

Weekly newspaper hosted in Niagara Falls, New York, USA

- Type: Weekly newspaper
- Format: Tabloid
- Editor-in-chief: Frank Parlato, Jr.
- Managing editor: James Hufnagel
- Founded: 2000
- Circulation: 20,000
- Website: www.niagarafallsreporter.com

The Niagara Reporter is a weekly opinion-based newspaper and website hosted in Niagara Falls, New York. It was founded on June 28, 2000 by journalist Mike Hudson. The newspaper is currently owned by Frank R. Parlato, Jr., who additionally serves as one of the newspaper's contributors. The paper conducts investigative reporting which focuses on public corruption, politics, and local news.

The Niagara Reporter has also begun accepting classified ads and serves as one of the largest news publications in Niagara County.

== History ==
The Niagara Reporter was launched on June 28, 2000, by journalist Mike Hudson, who had previously worked for newspapers in Ohio, Pennsylvania and New York City. Hudson had also been a reporter for the Niagara Gazette and was the lead singer of Cleveland punk band The Pagans. He died on October 27, 2017.
