= Lafayette Morehouse =

Californian intentional community

Coordinates: 37.918950°N 122.094759°W

Lafayette Morehouse is an intentional community conceived in 1968 in Lafayette, California. The lifestyle it practices is often referred to as "Morehouse". The groups was founded by Victor Baranco and his first wife Suzanne Baranco, and is now led by his widow Cynthia Baranco, Morehouse has existed for over 50 years, one of few such communities still in existence from the 1960s.

The group positions itself as "researchers" studying the nature of pleasurable group living. They believe that group living best fits the nature of humans and can lead to the most enjoyable life. The group formerly operated More University, an unaccredited institution that taught courses on the group's philosophy. The group continues to offer paid courses.

== Philosophy ==
The cornerstone of the "More philosophy" is the concept of perfection – the belief that people and situations are right the way they are and that perfection includes the potential for change. This includes the viewpoint that individuals are totally responsible for their lives, including thoughts, emotions, and behaviors.

The term "More" is used in the sense that "if the world is good, then more can only mean better." Residents consider themselves to be "responsible hedonists" – with the idea that the best possible life includes concern for the welfare of others and that apparent pleasure at the expense of others is not pleasure. This viewpoint is expressed in a quote from Dr. Baranco: "Fun is the goal; love is the way."

== History ==
The community was founded by appliance salesman Victor Baranco (son of the Oakland jazz pianist Wilbert Baranco). He conceived of the Morehouse lifestyle as one in which people could live together pleasurably without doing anything they did not want to do.

Morehouse positions itself as a research organization investigating human sexuality and group living. The group gained notoriety for the 1976 public demonstrations of a woman in continuous orgasm for three hours, which it claims were the first known demonstrations of that kind. The group claims to have since trained many people to this standard.

The group initially offered courses under the title "Institute of Human Abilities." In 1997, More University was created as a DBA of Lafayette Morehouse Inc., a for-profit corporation that had been formed in 1972. More University was authorized to grant bachelor of humanities degrees, master's degrees in communication, as well as doctoral degrees in lifestyles and sensuality, with the faculty drawn from senior members of the group. Over a 20-year period it granted degrees to fewer than 90 people. In 1997, responding to a change in the law, Lafayette Morehouse declined to pursue recertification of the university under the new rules, and More University was dissolved. No further degrees were granted and the group resumed doing business as Lafayette Morehouse, with much of the same curriculum.

Victor Baranco died in 2002. Cynthia Baranco, his widow of 27 years, has continued to lead the group. On July 14, 2018, the community celebrated its 50th anniversary.

Over the years a substantial number of communal living experiments using Morehouse principles have been conducted. (Note: Sources have estimated between 30 and 100 such communities existed at the peak in the 1970s.) Most of these have been in northern California, but related communities have also been located in New York, Pennsylvania, Georgia, Hawaii, and other states. Currently, the primary community is in Lafayette, California on Purson Lane. There is also a Morehouse in Oakland.

== Life in the community ==
According to the group, the everyday goal is to live pleasurably with one's friends. Residents pursue their individual goals with the support of the group. Residents also share group goals and participate in group activities, such as maintenance of the property, entertaining family and friends, putting on courses, and holiday celebrations.

People have their own money and make contributions to communal expenses, goals, and projects. Some residents have jobs outside of Morehouse.

According to their website, "There is no label regarding sexual choices that applies across the board for our group. Sexual preference is a personal choice. Some people here are celibate, many are monogamous and some have more than one partner." Residents adhere to a strict sexual health screening program, begun in the late 1970s, to prevent the spread of sexually transmitted infections.

The political expression of the More philosophy is called the one no-vote, a decision-making system in which any participant, can cast an irrevocable no-vote that stops any proposed new action.

One source estimates that as of 1997, over 100,000 people had taken at least one Lafayette Morehouse course, and over 1,000 people had lived in a Morehouse and participated in the social research.

== Criticisms and controversies ==
More University was criticized for not having the faculty and facilities of a conventional university. According to a 1994 article in Heterodoxy magazine, the choice of faculty was criticized as being too insular. The organization was also accused of being a diploma mill. More University was forced to shut down in 1997.

One widely cited criticism of Victor Baranco and the Morehouse community was in David Felton's book Mindfuckers. The section on Baranco was repackaged from two Rolling Stone magazine articles, and the principal allegation was that he profited excessively by having group members pay to live in houses while renovating them.

Morehouse has been described as a "sex commune" or "sex cult,"

The group has been criticized for having poor relationships with its neighbors. Most of these criticisms date to the period (1991–2000) in which the group provided food and shelter to a large number of homeless people, using military surplus tents. The county sought to enforce zoning codes to end the activity. The group argued it was their right to use their own home to take care of people that were homeless. The group undertook a lawsuit against the San Francisco Chronicle, which they lost. After a long court battle with Contra Costa County, Lafayette Morehouse was ordered to take down the tents.

== Works ==
- Aquarius, Oakland, CA, US: Institute of Human Abilities, OCLC 857504947, published irregularly from 1969 to 2004
- "Morehouse – Choosing Your Family". Communities. No. 146. Spring 2010. p. 35. ISSN 0199-9346. OCLC 921224155.
