= Ellen Huet =

American Journalist

Ellen Huet is an American journalist known for her investigative reporting on startups, Silicon Valley culture, and technology. She is a features writer for Bloomberg News and Bloomberg Businessweek, where she covers topics including artificial intelligence, consumer technology, and tech industry power dynamics.

== Early life and education ==
Huet was born and raised in Fremont, California. She attended Stanford University, where she earned a Bachelor of Arts in English and Political Science. During her time at Stanford, she was a senior staff writer and managing news editor for The Stanford Daily.

== Career ==
Huet began her journalism career at the San Francisco Chronicle, where she covered crime and breaking news. She later joined Forbes as a staff writer, reporting on technology and its societal impacts. In December 2015, she joined Bloomberg, where she continues to focus on in-depth stories related to the tech industry and startup culture.

=== OneTaste investigation ===
In 2018, Huet wrote an investigative piece for Bloomberg Businessweek titled "The Dark Side of the Orgasmic Meditation Company", which examined OneTaste, a company promoting "orgasmic meditation". The article detailed allegations of abusive labor practices and coercion within the organization. The company was later investigated by the Federal Bureau of Investigation.

=== "Foundering" podcast ===
In 2020, Huet reported and hosted the seven-part narrative podcast Foundering, which examined the rise and fall of WeWork and its co-founder Adam Neumann. The podcast received first place in the SABEW Best in Business audio category and was a finalist for the Livingston Award. In 2024, Huet hosted another season of Foundering, which chronicled the founding and internal power struggles at OpenAI, with a character study of CEO Sam Altman.

=== Awards and recognition ===
Huet has received several accolades throughout her career:

- Finalist for the Livingston Award (2021) for her work on the Foundering podcast.
- First place in the SABEW Best in Business audio category (2020) for Foundering.
- First place in the Digital Media: Breaking News category at the Bay Area Journalism Awards (2020) for her coverage of WeWork's IPO filing.

== Selected publications ==
- "The Dark Side of the Orgasmic Meditation Company" – Bloomberg Businessweek
- "They Invented the Must-Have Instrument for the Burning Man Set. Now They Want to Kill It Off" – Bloomberg Businessweek
- "WeWork Wants to Become Its Own Landlord With Latest Spending Spree" – Bloomberg Businessweek
- Empire of Orgasm: Sex, Power, and the Downfall of a Wellness Cult (October 2025)
