= Topeka Sam =

Criminal justice advocate

Topeka K. Sam
- Occupation: Criminal Justice Advocate
- Organization: The Ladies of Hope Ministries
- Criminal charges: Conspiracy to Possess With Intent to Distribute Over Five Kilograms of Cocaine
- Criminal penalty: 52 months' imprisonment (as amended by the Bureau of Prisons pursuant to court orders on March 5, 2014, and November 2, 2015); five years' supervised release
- Criminal status: Pardoned on December 23, 2020 by Donald J. Trump
- Voice of Topeka K. Sam Sam speaks at the Panel Discussion at the Prison Reform Summit; Recorded May 18th, 2018
- Website: thelohm.org

Topeka Kimberly Sam is an American advocate for criminal justice reform and a former federal prisoner. She was sentenced to over 10 years in prison in January 2013 after pleading guilty to her role in a drug trafficking conspiracy. She was released early from the Federal Correctional Institution, Danbury (FCI Danbury) in 2015 and became involved in helping women transition back into society after incarceration. President Donald Trump granted a full pardon to Sam on December 23, 2020.

== Early life, crime, and sentence ==
Sam grew up in a predominantly white neighborhood in Long Island, New York. She attended a historically black college and university (HBCU) in Baltimore, Maryland. While in college, Sam became involved with a romantic partner who sold drugs, exposing her to drug dealers. She eventually dropped out of school and held a job at Amtrak and pursued business ventures.

On April 24, 2012, Sam was arrested for her alleged role in a multi-kilogram drug trafficking conspiracy. She was accused of involvement in facilitating the acquisition of cocaine, including a transaction involving 80 kg of the substance. Sam pleaded guilty on January 11, 2013, and she was sentenced to over 10 years imprisonment (130 months) at the Federal Correctional Institution, Danbury (FCI Danbury).

A judge later reduced her sentence after she wrote a letter, filed an appeal, and participated in a drug program; she received an early release in 2015.

== Activism ==
After her release from federal prison in 2015, Sam began helping women transition back into society after incarceration. In 2017, she founded the non-profit The Ladies of Hope Ministries. This organization's activities include providing resources related to education, housing, and groceries, including the Angel Food Delivery Program. As of December 2022, the Angel Food Delivery Program had delivered over 9,000 bags of groceries to families impacted by the criminal justice system.

In addition, Sam and another woman who was incarcerated alongside her, Vanee Sykes, established the Hope House in the Castle Hill neighborhood of the Bronx. The organization aimed to provide transitional housing for female parolees. The Hope House remained vacant at first because the state corrections department deemed it unsuitable due to neighbors’ concerns about safety. As of December 2023, the Hope House is operational in New Orleans, LA, and Prince George's County, MD, with an on-site coordinator that helps residents to obtain IDs, apply for public assistance, and receive training.

Other advocacy by Sam includes her efforts to bring attention to the case of Alice Marie Johnson. Johnson was serving a life sentence for a nonviolent drug offense, and Sam produced a video about advocating for her release. The video inspired Kim Kardashian to lobby the Trump Administration for Johnson's clemency and pardon, which he granted.

Sam has also advocated for The First Step Act. This legislation aimed to reduce the mandatory minimum sentences for certain non-violent offenses. It also sought to improve the conditions of prisons and to provide better support for individuals re-entering society post-incarceration. The White House Prison Reform Summit invited Sam to speak at 2018. Her speech included insights from her experience in federal prison. She talked about conditions and challenges faced by incarcerated women, including challenges with obtaining sanitary pads.

== Presidential pardon ==
Presidential pardon for Topeka Sam

On December 23, 2020, President Donald Trump granted a full pardon to Sam, citing her efforts in criminal justice reform. This pardon was facilitated by businessman Daniel Loeb, who lobbied the White House on Sam's behalf. Loeb's involvement was due to a partnership between one of his companies and Sam's organization, Ladies of Hope Ministries.

== Recognition ==
On May 5, 2022, Sam received Google's inaugural Social Impact Award. The award was bestowed for her work to reduce rates of incarceration among women. The award included a $100,000 grant. She received an Honorary Doctorate in Divinity from New York Theological Seminary in May of the same year.

She has been a fellow at Columbia University and the first previously incarcerated board member of the Marshall Project. Sam has also worked as a filmmaker for 44 Blue Productions.
