= Corrlinks =

Prison email system company

- Industry: Private

Corrlinks is a privately owned company that operates the Trust Fund Limited Inmate Computer System (TRULINCS), the email system used by the United States Federal Bureau of Prisons to allow inmates to communicate with the outside world. CorrLinks is a subsidiary of Advanced Technologies Group.

TRULINCS is a fee-based system that inmates must pay for in order to send or receive email. Unlike commercial sites which allow correspondents to send an email which is then printed and mailed to an inmate, this service provides direct email access to federal inmates. Inmates must pay $0.05 per minute for use of this computer system, and they may print messages at a cost of $0.15 per page. Sending a message to someone can cost up to $0.30. As a comparison, in many U.S. federal prisons, inmates wages start at $0.12 per hour. This service is also available in some state prisons, such as those in Iowa.

Not all federal inmates have Corrlinks access, and inmates may be barred from using the service if their particular crimes involved the use of a computer in any manner. The system does not allow inmates access to the Internet, and all incoming and outgoing messages are monitored. Emails are limited to 13,000 characters and no attachments are allowed (attachments will be removed, which sometimes corrupts the rest of the message). The content of the email may not "jeopardize the public or the safety, security, or orderly operation of the correctional facility".

TRULINCS has been available at federal prison facilities since 2009.

Some state-run prisons have a similar email system available, called JPay, which is owned by Securus Technologies, a prison technology company.
