= Alexander brothers (sex offenders) =

Israeli-American businessmen and convicted sex offenders

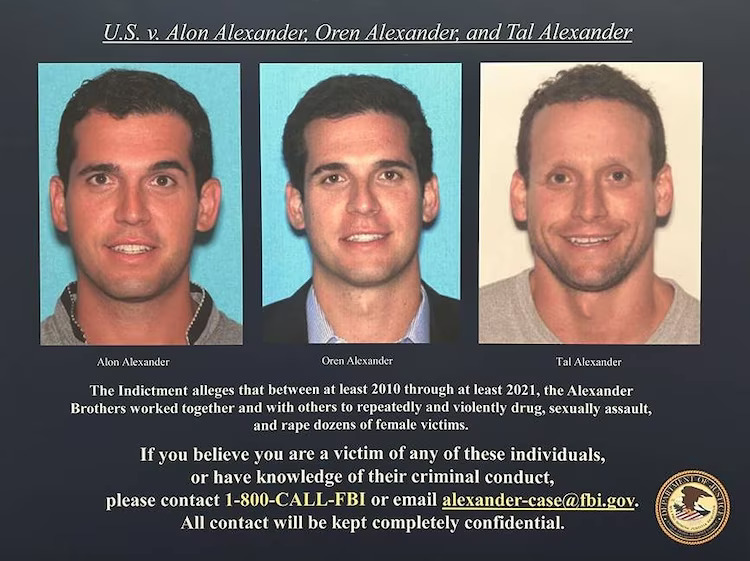
- Poster of the brothers released by the United States Department of Justice
- Born: Oren Alexander; July 5, 1987 (age 39); Alon Alexander; July 5, 1987 (age 39); Tal Alexander; July 2, 1986 (age 40)
- Occupations: Tal and Oren: Real estate agents Alon: Private security executive
- Convictions: Sex trafficking Conspiracy to commit sex trafficking Inducement to travel to engage in unlawful sexual activity

Details
- Victims: Dozens confirmed 60+ alleged
- Date apprehended: December 11, 2024
- Imprisoned at: Metropolitan Detention Center, Brooklyn

Twin brothers Oren Alexander and Alon Alexander (born July 5, 1987), and their older brother Tal Alexander (born July 2, 1986), are American businessmen and convicted sex offenders. Tal and Oren were luxury real estate brokers based in Miami and New York City, while Alon was an executive at his family’s private security company.

In 2024, a series of civil lawsuits were filed by women alleging they had been drugged and sexually assaulted by one or more of the brothers. Federal prosecutors in New York began investigating potential crimes, and in December 2024, the three brothers were arrested on sex trafficking and sexual assault charges, following allegations that they had drugged and assaulted women for more than a decade. The brothers were convicted on March 9, 2026. All three were sentenced to 30 years in prison.

== Early life ==
Tal, Oren, and Alon Alexander were born in the United States to Israeli-born parents who had moved to the United States in the 1970s. In 1982, their parents started a security company, Kent Security Services, and later expanded into real estate. The Alexander brothers eventually joined the family business.

Oren graduated from the University of Colorado Boulder with a Bachelor of Arts degree in finance. Tal attended Hofstra University in Hempstead, New York (on Long Island in southeastern New York), where he played collegiate tennis, and received a Bachelor's degree in Marketing. Alon graduated from New York Law School (in Manhattan).

== Careers ==
In 2008, Tal and Oren moved from Florida to New York City. They joined Douglas Elliman Real Estate as brokers. Oren's first major deal was the sale of an $8.2 million penthouse in Manhattan to Jim Ferraro in 2009. In 2012, they founded the Alexander Team at Douglas Elliman. Alon pursued a career as an executive in the family business, Kent Security Services.

In 2019, the brothers co-represented Ken Griffin, the buyer in the United States' most expensive residential home transaction, when a 24,000-square-foot (2,200 m^{2}) penthouse, at 220 Central Park South, sold for $238 million. This sale surpassed the prior record when Barry Rosenstein had paid $137 million for his home in The Hamptons in 2014. In 2019, the brothers sold a property in Miami for $50 million, the most expensive single-family home ever sold in Miami.

The brothers' clients included the private equity investor Leon Black, entertainer Lindsay Lohan, singer-songwriter Liam Gallagher, the married couple socialite-businesswoman Kim Kardashian and rapper-producer Kanye West, and the fashion businessmen Steve Madden and Tommy Hilfiger. Oren Alexander appeared in a Forbes 30 Under 30 real estate list.

In June 2022, the brothers left Douglas Elliman to launch their own firm, named "Official". The twin brothers were described as "fixtures in the New York and Miami nightlife circuit".

== Rumors and early accusations ==
Reports of alleged sexual misconduct involving the Alexander brothers date back to their years as students in Miami. A 2026 investigation by The Miami Herald reported that women had described incidents involving the brothers dating to the early 2000s, when they were teenagers attending Dr. Michael M. Krop Senior High School. The investigation also reported that one woman had contacted police about an alleged incident during that period, while other women described experiences from their high-school years. Federal prosecutors have likewise alleged that the brothers' sexual violence began while they were still in high school.

Earlier reporting also described allegations and warnings circulating among students and people in the Miami area. In 2024, The Miami Herald reported that several people familiar with the brothers said allegations of sexual misconduct had been an open secret in the area and that some former classmates had warned others to keep their distance from them. The brothers' attorney denied the allegations.

In December 2009, an anonymous blog post appeared online alleging that Oren and Alon Alexander had sexually assaulted a teenage girl at a party in 2003. The post's author was never publicly identified, and The New York Times later reported that it could not independently verify whether the incident described in the post had occurred.

The brothers subsequently pursued legal action against the anonymous publisher. According to Inman, a lawsuit filed in Florida in 2013 targeted the blog and other online posts that accused the brothers of rape. In 2014, a judge issued a temporary injunction requiring the removal of posts concerning the allegations. The blog was later taken down, and the case was dismissed in 2016. Screenshots of the blog post continued to circulate online.

== Legal issues ==
More than 30 women accused Oren and his twin brother, Alon, of sexual assault in June 2024. Tal was also implicated in multiple assaults. Several of the accusations, some dating back decades, were corroborated by "dozens of former classmates, brokerage employees and agents".

=== Arrest ===
On the morning of December 11, 2024, the three Alexander brothers were arrested by FBI agents in Miami Beach, Florida on charges of sex trafficking and drugging and raping dozens of women. Oren and Alon were charged together, while Tal was charged separately. In addition to being charged by the Southern District of Florida and the Miami-Dade State Attorney's Office, all three brothers were given a three-count indictment by the Southern District of New York. Their case in New York was assigned to U.S. District Judge Valerie E. Caproni. Their case in Florida was assigned to United States Magistrate Judge Lisette M. Reid of the Southern District of Florida. In the New York federal charges, the three brothers were each charged with one count of engaging in a sex trafficking conspiracy, which carries a maximum sentence of life in prison, and at least one count of sex trafficking by force, fraud, or coercion, which carries a maximum sentence of life in prison and a mandatory minimum sentence of 15 years in prison. Also in New York, Tal was charged with a second federal count of sex trafficking by force, fraud, or coercion.

The charges were expanded before trial. On January 8, 2026, a grand jury returned a superseding indictment adding counts against Alon and Oren over an alleged incident aboard a Bahamian-flagged cruise ship in 2012, in which they were accused of engaging in a sexual act with a woman "while she was physically incapable of declining participation". The same indictment alleged that in 2009 Oren had recorded himself and another person engaging in sexual activity with an incapacitated 17-year-old girl in Manhattan. All three pleaded not guilty.

Oren and Alon, whose booking photos were made public shortly after they were booked into Miami-Dade's Turner Guilford Knight Correctional Center, also awaited trial in Miami Beach on separate state sexual battery charges. Oren was charged on three accounts of sexual battery, while Alon was charged on one. Tal, whose case is primarily based in New York, did not appear in Miami-Dade County's inmate search following his arrest.

Shortly after his arrest, Tal appeared in a South Florida federal court as part of the New York sex trafficking investigation against him. During the hearing, prosecutors requested that Tal be held in New York, with the presiding judge setting a detention and removal hearing for December 13, 2024.

On December 12, 2024, Miami-Dade Circuit Court Judge Mindy Glazer ordered Oren and Alon temporarily held without bond on the state charges, with a hearing on a final decision scheduled for the next day. On December 13, 2024, Oren and Alon Alexander were each granted bail by Miami-Dade circuit judge Circuit Judge Lody Jean for the state charges, with Oren granted a $3 million bond and Alon a $2 million bond. Their bonds were secured after their father, Shlomy Alexander, put up his home in Bal Harbour, Florida as collateral. The twin brothers agreed to be placed under house arrest, surrender their passports, and stay away from the alleged victims. However, as the hearing, under the jurisdiction of a local circuit court, only applied to the state charges, Oren and Alon remained in prison on federal charges. For the duration of the federal sex trafficking case, which also included their brother Tal, Oren and Alon were not released from custody.

During his December 13 court hearing, Tal, who was already in federal custody, was denied bond, as Miami-Dade federal Judge Lissette Reid deemed him to be a significant flight risk. The ruling came in spite of an offer from the Alexander family to pay $115 million in real estate holdings to secure Tal's release. With this ruling, Tal was ordered to remain in federal custody until his trial.

It was initially agreed that Oren and Alon would be released from local Miami police custody on December 16, and transferred into federal custody. Following the bail hearings, it was reported that Oren and Alon would appear in a Miami federal court during that week, with the three brothers expected to be transferred to New York. By December 13, 2024, approximately 40 alleged victims, including minors, had accused the Alexander brothers of rape. During a court hearing on December 16, Oren and Alon's attorney Joel Denaro agreed to delay their release from local custody, alleging that the proper paperwork to finalize the bond agreement for the twin brothers had not been correctly submitted to the county jail. It was also stated that even after their first appearance in federal court, Oren and Alon would both remain at the Turner Guilford Knight Correctional Center until at least the pre-trial detention hearing. The first federal hearing for Oren and Alon was set to be held on December 19, 2024.

On December 19, Oren and Alon were transferred from state custody to a federal detention facility in Miami, prior to their pre-trial court hearing. At the hearing that day, Denaro informed Judge Jean that he would not proceed with the issue of bonds for the twin brothers until a later time, when the federal case was resolved. On December 20, Oren and Alon appeared in the federal court, where federal magistrate Judge Ellen D'Angelo scheduled their bond hearing for December 30, 2024. All three Alexander brothers remained in federal custody in Florida at that time.

On January 3, 2025, Oren's bond decision was delayed. The bond was denied for Alon.

On January 14, 2025, federal prosecutors in New York announced that they had in their possession video evidence showing that each of the brothers filmed some of their sexual assaults of impaired women. On January 15, 2025, Tal, Oren, and Alon were all denied bail by New York federal judge Valerie Caproni, and were also ordered to eventually be transferred from Miami to New York.

On May 8, 2025, Oren, Tal and Alon Alexander each received additional criminal charges, including sex trafficking of a minor.

=== Trial ===
The trial was presided over by judge Valerie E. Caproni. Assistant U.S. Attorney Madison Smyser in opening statements said, "The brothers used whatever means necessary — sometimes drugs, sometimes alcohol, sometimes brute force — to carry out their rapes." During the trial, the jury heard testimony from a woman who said that she met the brothers and was drugged by them, before awakening nude in bed with them. Part of the evidence used at trial was a video that Oren Alexander had filmed of himself during a sexual assault he was committing. Lawyers for the brothers argued that they were playboys and womanizers but not criminals and that the victims were motivated by "shame, regret and greed." They argued that the sex was consensual, and questioned the reliability of the accusers' memories.

In late January 2026, during the second week of the trial, the Justice Department released around three million pages of documents from the Epstein files. Among them was an email from a lawyer that inadvertently disclosed the name of one of the eight complainants in the case, whose allegation formed the basis of one of the counts; prosecutors had withheld all eight names from the public. An assistant United States attorney told the court that the material had been "inadvertently released", and it was subsequently redacted on the department's website. Defence lawyers argued that the release was grounds for a mistrial, one of them saying that "the prosecutor's office itself has branded the defendants with the most toxic association in modern legal history". Caproni denied the motion, but questioned the jurors, each of whom said they had not followed reporting on the case, and ordered the government not to release further material from the files relating to the brothers until a verdict was returned. The New York Times reported that none of the documents provided evidence that the brothers were involved in Epstein's sex-trafficking operation, and that the charges against them were unrelated to his crimes. The newspaper also reported that the brothers were named elsewhere in the released files in an allegation of sexual assault of a minor that had first been made to the Federal Bureau of Investigation in 2019, and that the intake form recording it appeared in the release along with a 2025 email in which the allegation was forwarded to investigators as part of a compilation of claims.

The trial lasted five weeks in which more than a dozen women testified that the brothers had drugged and sexually assaulted them.

=== Conviction ===
The three Alexander brothers were convicted in Manhattan Federal Court on all charges, including the most serious of sex trafficking, on March 9, 2026. They each faced a minimum of fifteen years in federal prison when sentenced. The jury reached its verdict after approximately eight hours of deliberation. Oren and Alon Alexander were convicted on all twelve counts they faced; Tal Alexander was convicted on all ten counts he faced.

In Miami-Dade County, where Oren and Alon Alexander had separately been charged under Florida law in December 2024, prosecutors dropped one of the sexual battery charges against Oren at a hearing on April 15, 2026, the first since the federal verdict. Assistant State Attorney Natalie Snyder told the court that the woman who had accused Oren of assaulting her at his Miami Beach home in October 2021 was satisfied with the federal conviction and did not want to undergo further trauma. Oren remained charged with two further counts of sexual battery, one of them a multiple-perpetrator count in which Alon was also charged; prosecutors said the twins would be moved to a Miami jail to await trial in Florida after their sentencing in New York.

The brothers have been held at the Metropolitan Detention Center, Brooklyn since the verdict. Sentencing, initially set for August 2026 but postponed in May and again in September, was scheduled for October 27, 2026. On October 27, 2026, all three brothers were each sentenced to 30 years in prison.

=== Lawsuits ===
On January 2, 2025, a lawsuit was filed against Oren and Alon in the U.S. District Court for the District of Colorado, by a Pennsylvania woman who alleged meeting the twin Alexander brothers at the 2017 Winter X Games in Aspen, Colorado. She said the brothers had drugged her and two of her friends before taking her to a hotel room, where Alon raped her with help from Oren. On January 3, 2025, two additional women, described as friends of the Pennsylvania-based accuser, had joined the Colorado federal lawsuit against Oren and Alon. The two new accusers alleged being drugged and then raped in the same hotel room by the twin Alexander brothers.

In March 2026, Tracy Tutor, host of Million Dollar Listing Los Angeles on Bravo, filed an additional lawsuit against Oren Alexander alleging he sexually assaulted her after a real estate event.

== In the media ==
Peacock released the three-part docuseries The Wolves of Real Estate: The Alexander Brothers on October 25, 2026
