= Edgewater Village Hall and Tappen Park =

- U.S. National Register of Historic Places
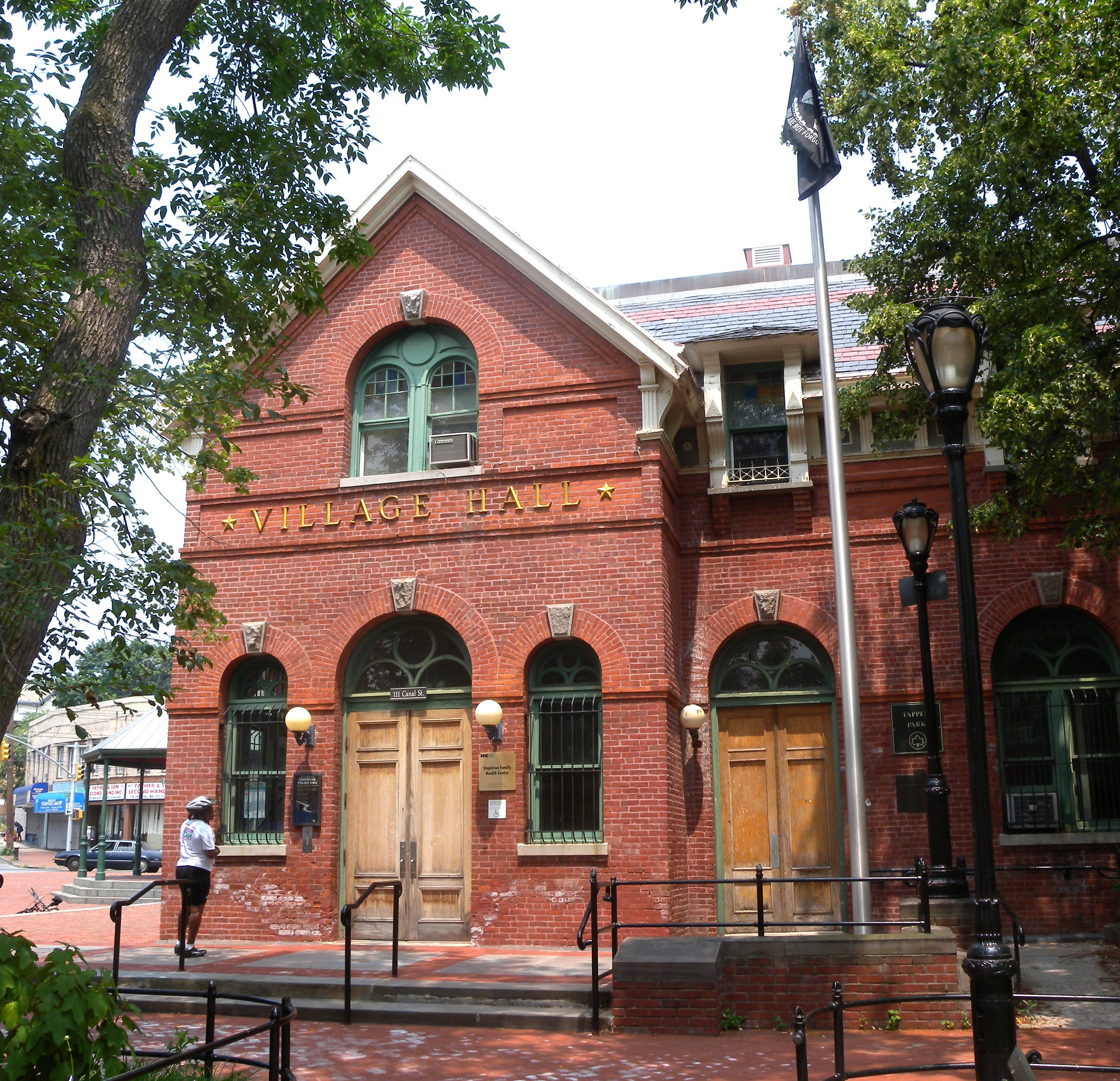
- Edgewater Village Hall, June 2010

- Location within New York City Location within New York Location within the United States
- Location: Bounded by Wright, Water, Bay and Canal Sts., Staten Island, New York
- Coordinates: 40°37′36″N 74°4′40″W
- Area: 1.5 acres (0.61 ha)
- Built: 1889
- Architect: Kuhne, Paul
- Architectural style: Late Victorian, Romanesque
- NRHP reference No.: 80002756
- Added to NRHP: May 19, 1980

Edgewater Village Hall is a historic former village hall situated within Tappen Park, a public park located in Stapleton, Staten Island, New York. The village hall was built in 1889 for the village of Edgewater, which was dissolved nine years later with the consolidation of New York City. The building is a 1 1/2-story, T-shaped building with a square tower and slate-covered hipped roof in the Romanesque Revival style, now used for municipal offices. The park dates to 1867 and provides a dramatic setting for the village hall.

It was added to the National Register of Historic Places in 1980.
