= Tappen Park =

Public park in Staten Island, New York

Coordinates: 40°37′37″N 74°04′36″W

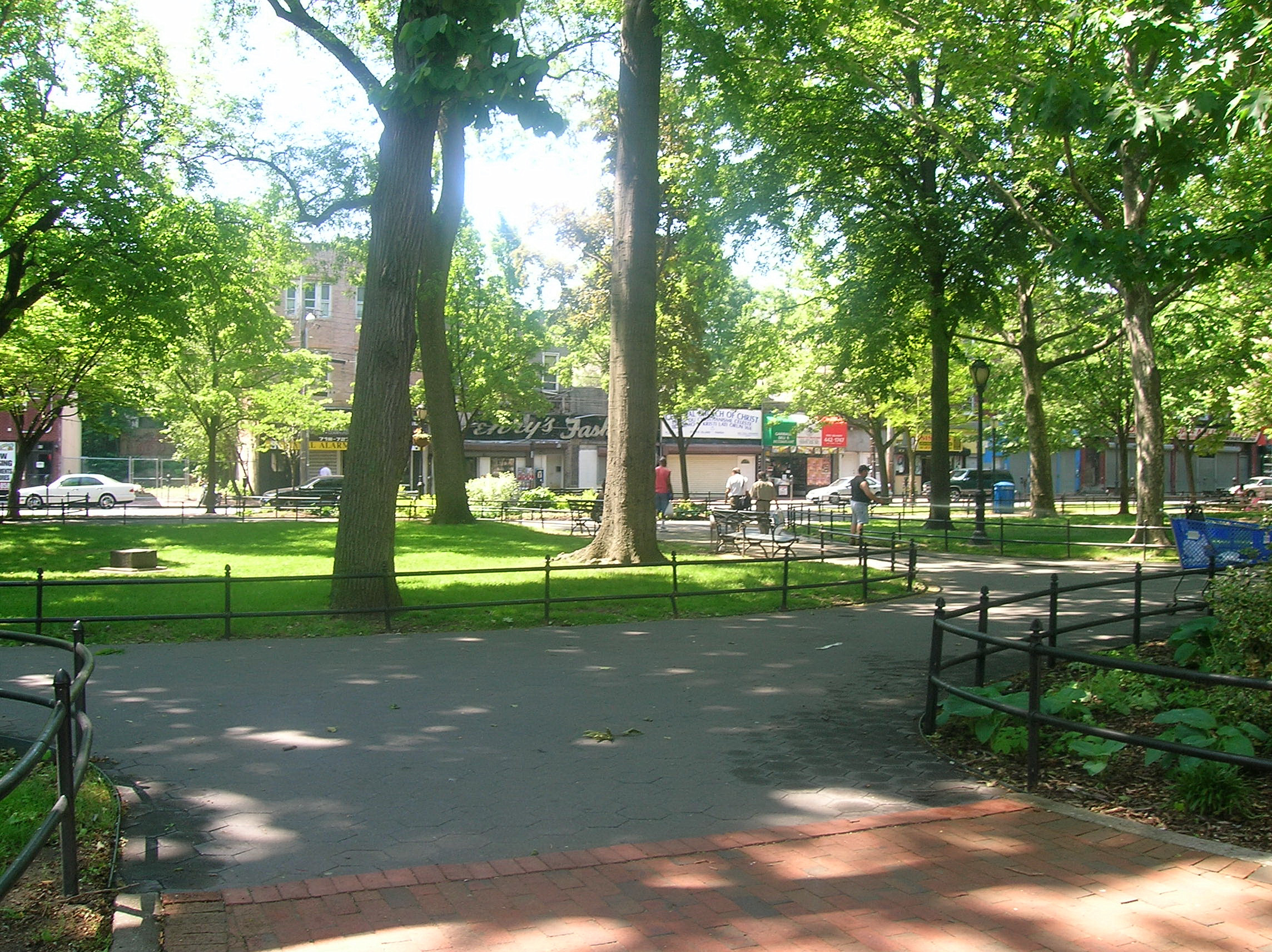
Tappen Park in May 2007

Tappen Park is a small park and square in the Stapleton neighborhood on the East Shore of Staten Island, New York City. It is bounded by Bay Street on the east, Water Street on the north, and Canal Street on the south and west. It is named for First World War veteran James Tappen. The land that the park is sited on was first purchased by the government in 1867, and it was acquired by the City of New York in 1898.

In 2008, the east end of the park facing Bay Street underwent improvements to add a small fountain amidst a round court, as well as new pathways. The renovated park is now reopened.

It was listed as part of the Edgewater Village Hall and Tappen Park on the National Register of Historic Places in 1980.
