= Stapleton, Staten Island =

Neighborhood in New York City

Stapleton
- Neighborhood of Staten Island
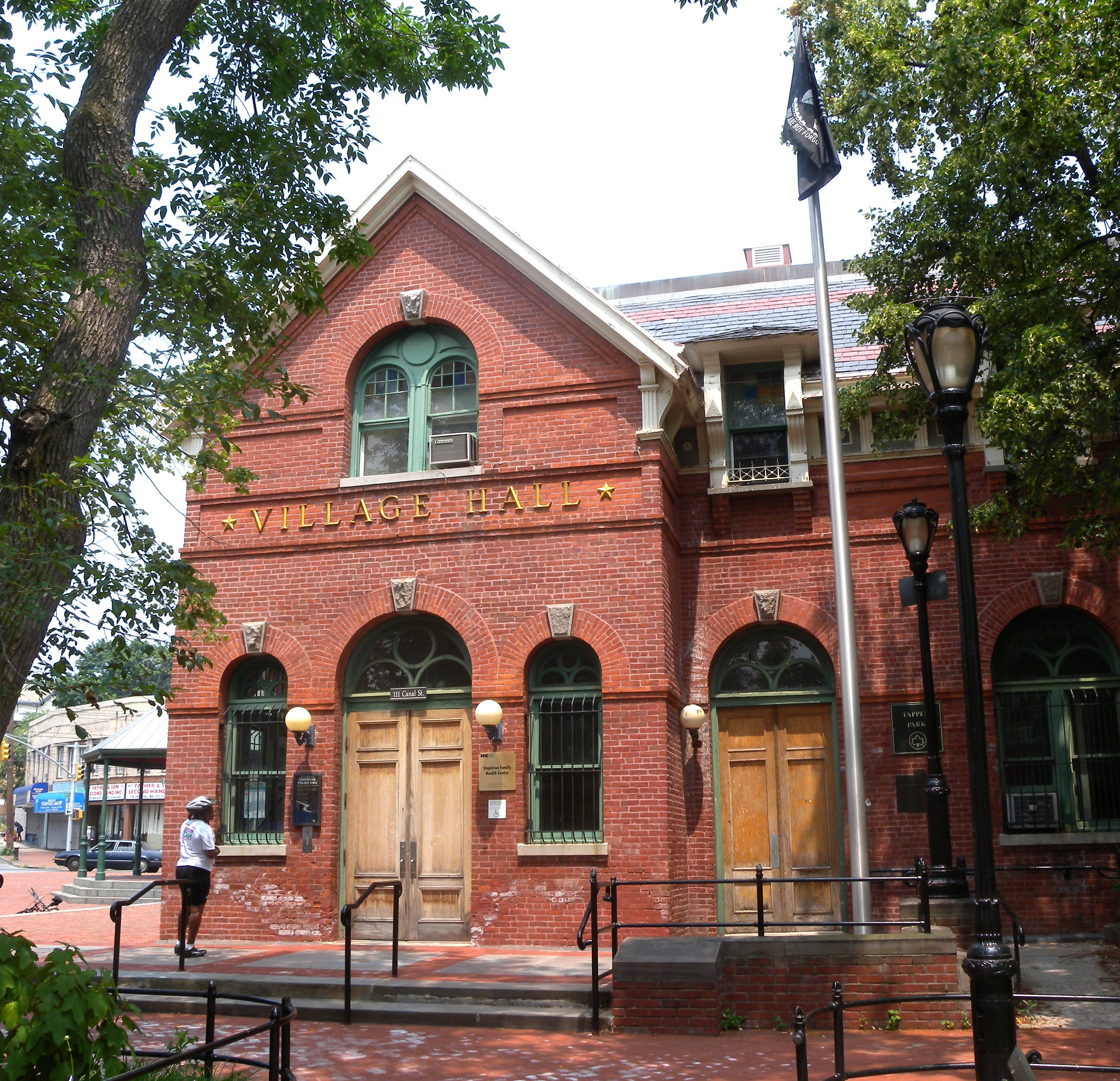
- Former Edgewater Village Hall
- Location in New York City
- Coordinates: 40.627°N 74.078°W
- Country: United States
- State: New York
- City: New York City
- Borough: Staten Island
- Community District: Staten Island 1

Area
  - Total: 2.171 sq mi (5.62 km^{2})

Population (2011)
  - Total: 37,669
  - Density: 17,350/sq mi (6,699/km^{2})
- Neighborhood tabulation area

Economics
  - Median income: $58,373
- ZIP Codes: 10304
- Area code: 718, 347, 929, and 917

Stapleton is a neighborhood in northeastern Staten Island in New York City, United States. It is located along the waterfront of Upper New York Bay, roughly bounded on the north by Tompkinsville at Grant Street, on the south by Clifton at Vanderbilt Avenue, and on the west by St. Paul's Avenue and Van Duzer Street, which form the border with the community of Grymes Hill.

Stapleton is one of the older waterfront neighborhoods of the borough, built in the 1830s on land once owned by the Vanderbilt family. It was a long-time commercial center of the island, but has struggled to revive after several decades of neglect following the 1964 construction of the Verrazzano–Narrows Bridge, which shifted the commercial development of the island to its interior.

Stapleton is part of Staten Island Community District 1 and its ZIP Code is 10304. Stapleton is patrolled by the 120th Precinct of the New York City Police Department.

== History ==
=== 19th century ===
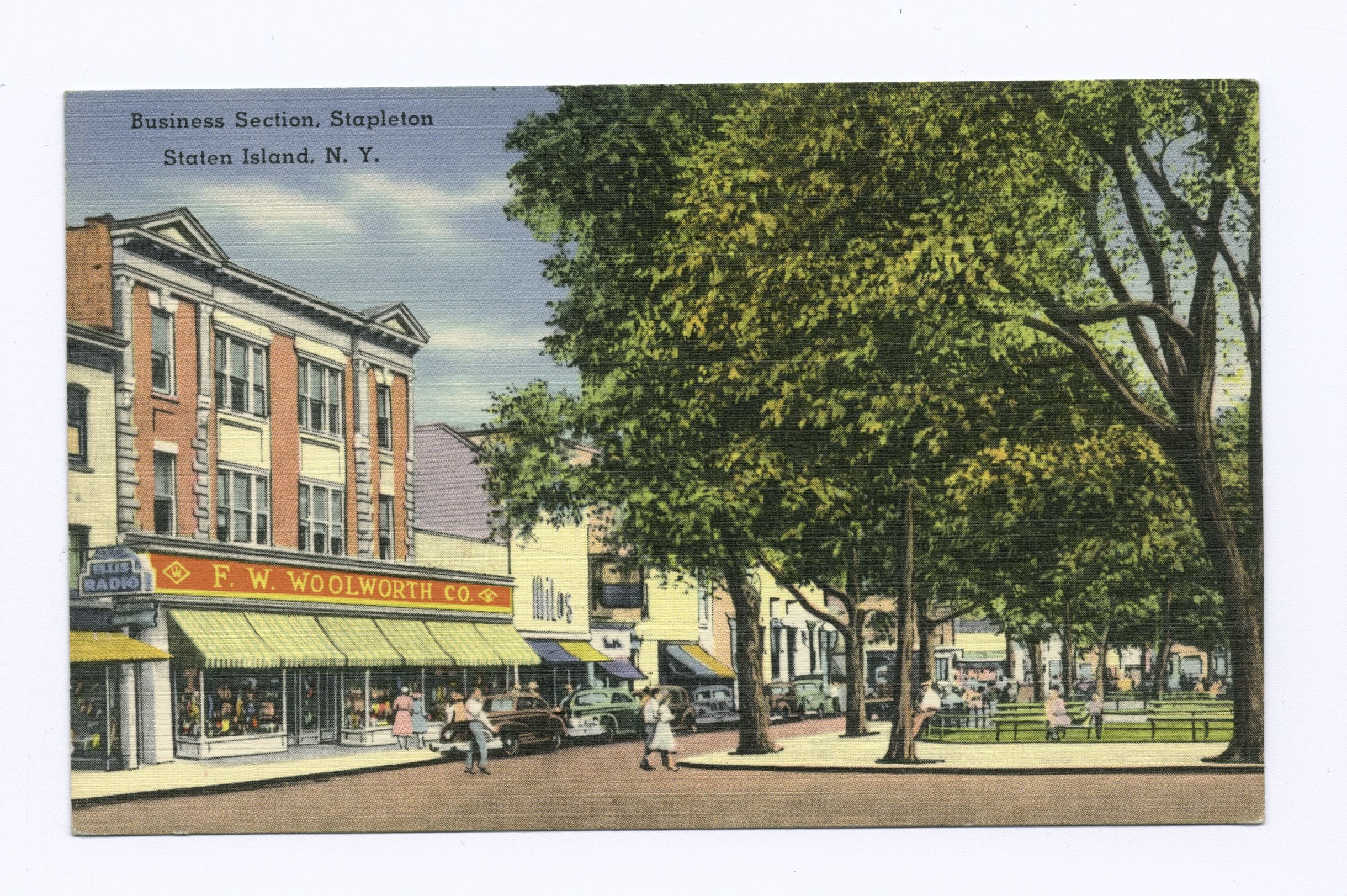
Business Section, Stapleton, mid-20th century

The neighborhood was the site of the farm where Cornelius Vanderbilt grew up, at the location of the present-day Paramount Theater building on Bay Street (the theater itself having closed in the early 1980s). In the early 19th century it became the commercial center of Southfield Township. In 1832 William J. Staples, a merchant from Manhattan for whom the neighborhood is named, as well as Minthorne Tompkins, the son of Vice President Daniel D. Tompkins, acquired land from the Vanderbilts and laid out the streets. Staples and Tompkins started a ferry service from the neighborhood waterfront to Manhattan and began advertising their new village in 1836.

Seaman's Retreat, a hospital for sailors entering New York Harbor, opened in 1832 and later became Bayley Seton Hospital, the largest employer in the neighborhood until the Sisters of Charity, an order of Roman Catholic nuns which operated the facility, closed it in 2004. (The property is sometimes reckoned as being in Clifton, Stapleton's neighbor to the south.) It was also for many years the site of a United States Public Health Service hospital.

The neighborhood was the location of several springs which led to the establishment of several German-American breweries in the middle 19th century. The last brewery closed in 1963.

In 1884, Stapleton was incorporated as the village of Edgewater. The old Village Hall still stands, located in Tappen Park. In 1884, the Staten Island Railway extended its track from the neighborhood northward to St. George, with a stop at Stapleton station. Direct ferry service from the neighborhood to Manhattan was halted two years later in 1886.

=== 20th and 21st centuries ===
Between 1929 and 1931, Stapleton had its own NFL pro football team, the Staten Island Stapletons. In their last two years they were known as the Staten Island Stapes. This professional American football team was founded in 1915 and played in the National Football League from 1929 to 1932. Jack Shapiro, who was a blocking back for the Stapletons, was the shortest player in NFL history.

In 1963, I.S.49, which sits across from the Stapleton Houses, opened. The Houses, a housing project sponsored by the State of New York, had opened two years earlier; at eight stories high, its buildings are the tallest within any such project on Staten Island, and is the largest New York City Housing Authority project in the borough.

In 2016, a 900-apartment housing complex named Urby opened on the site of the former Stapleton Homeport. The city government announced the North Shore Action Plan in 2023, which included various improvements in St. George, Tompkinsville, and Stapleton. In Stapleton, these would include a promenade, the Stapleton Beacon development project, and the redevelopment of another site on Front Street. Work on the promenade began in September 2024. The next year, city officials announced that a mixed-use development with 500 apartments would be built on part of the Stapleton Homeport site, next to Urby.

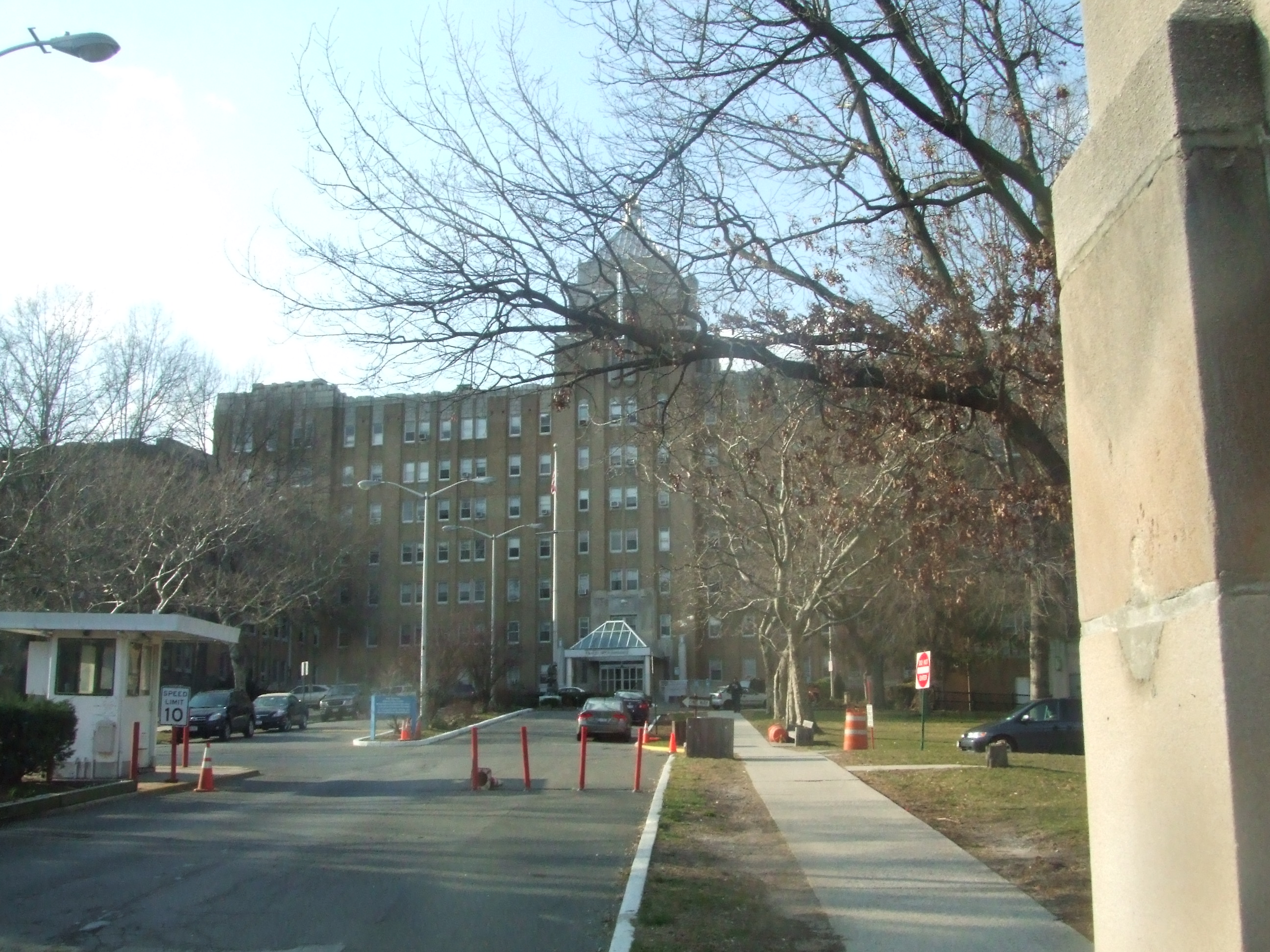
Bayley Seton Hospital, seen from Vanderbilt Avenue

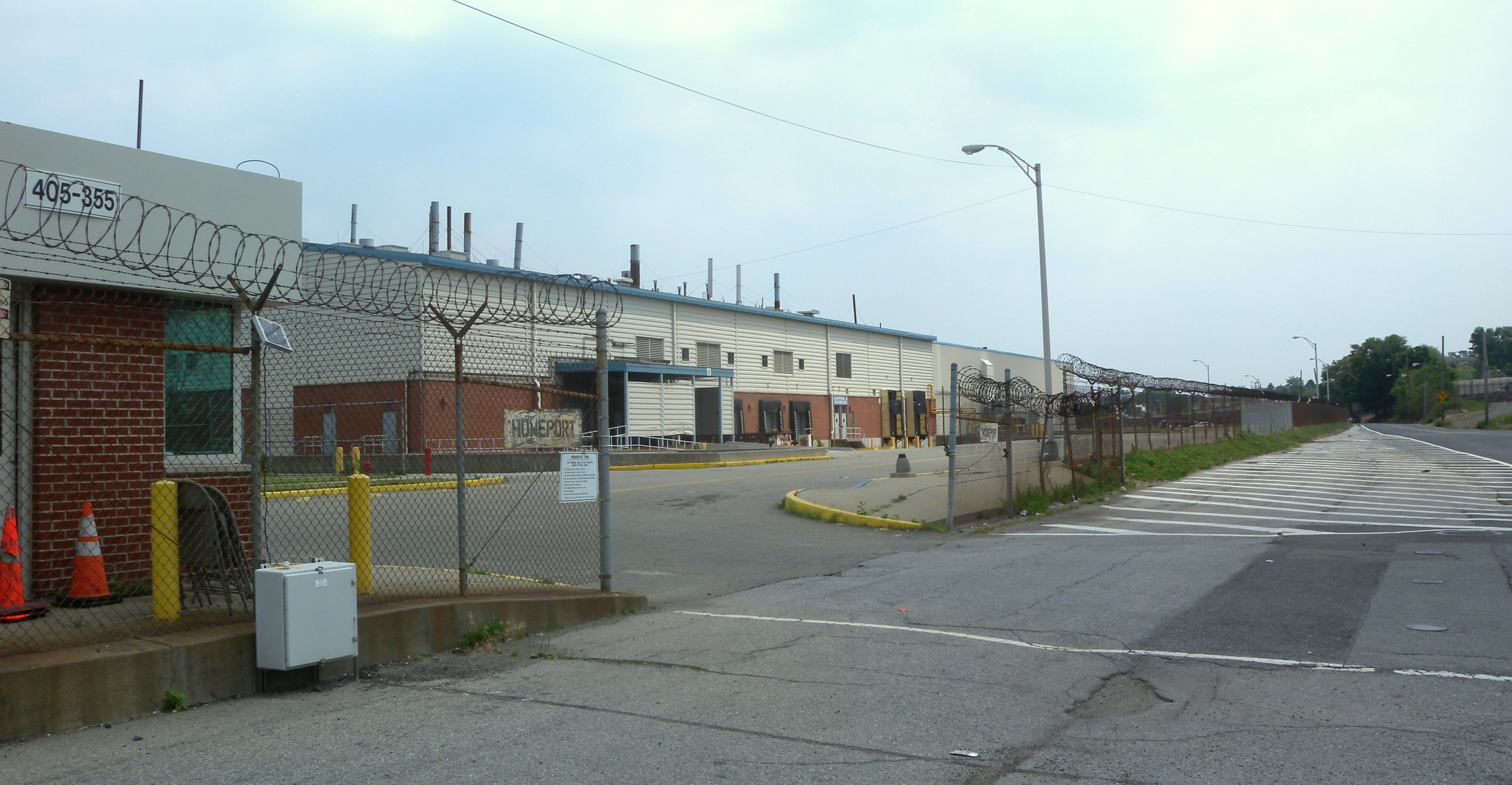
Homeport

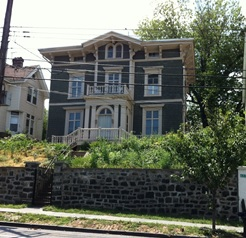
Boardman–Mitchell House

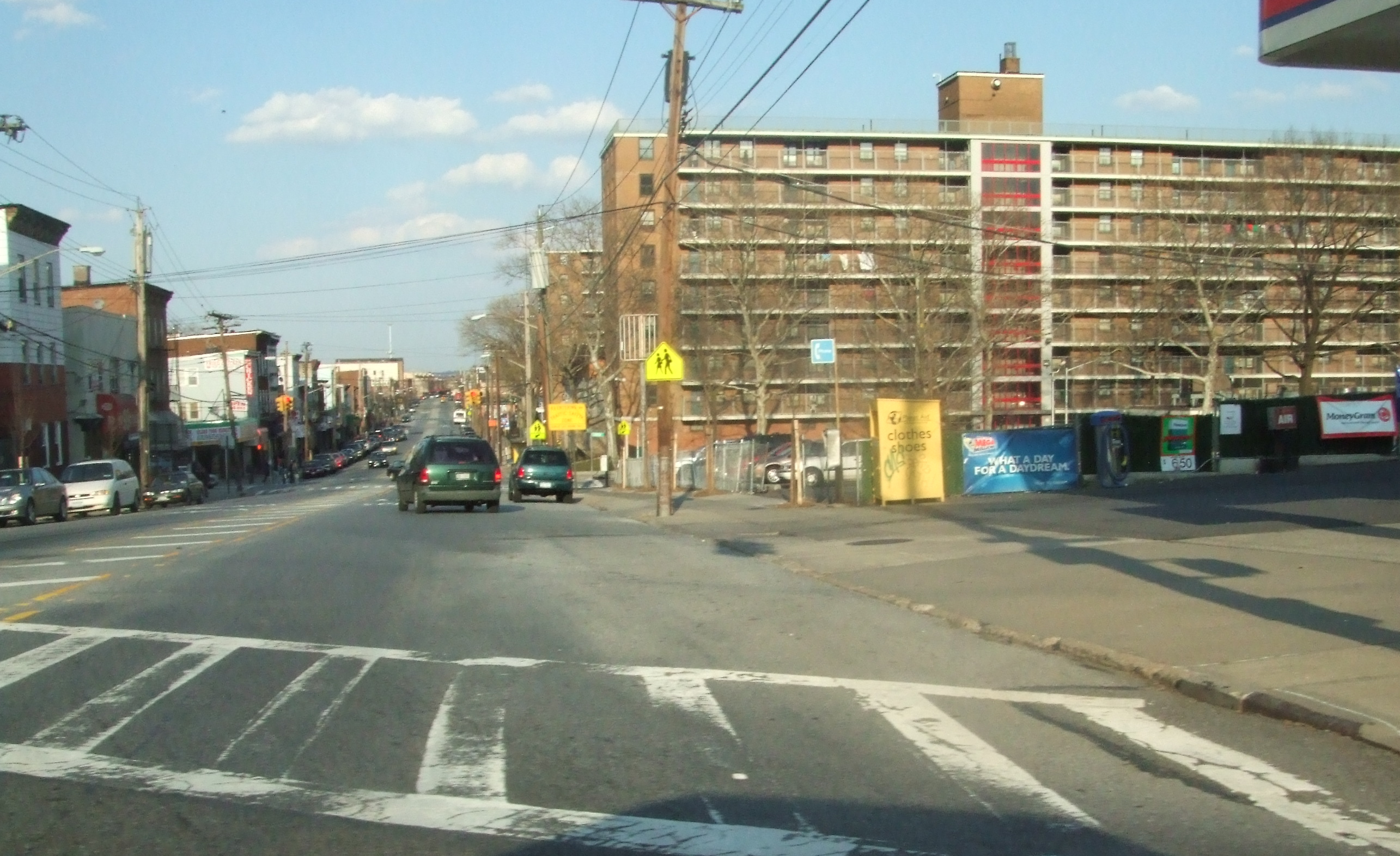
Stapleton Houses (right), looking northeast down Broad Street

=== Waterfront ===
The city built piers in 1920, but they were never fully exploited. From 1937 to 1942 several of the piers were used as the first Foreign Trade Zone in the United States. From 1942 to 1945, they became the Staten Island Terminal facility of the Army's New York Port of Embarkation. The U.S. Coast Guard operated their Section Base 2 there from the early 1920s until 1967, when they moved to Governors Island. After World War II, the piers once again became a foreign trade zone, but their use declined and most of the piers were demolished by the 1970s. The last, used for fishing, was removed when the U.S. Navy proposed to build a base in Stapleton in the 1980s.

In 1983, Secretary of the Navy John Lehman selected Stapleton to be the homeport for a naval unit headed by the battleship USS Iowa (BB-61), as part of the dispersal of the navy during a military build up ordered by President Ronald Reagan. This proposal became highly controversial throughout Staten Island when analysis of the proposal showed a net loss of civilian jobs on Staten Island (mainly due to expected job-seekers among naval dependents, but also due to a loss of businesses forced out by the naval presence). It was also controversial because of the belief that the Tomahawk cruise missiles aboard the Iowa and an accompanying Aegis cruiser would, in at least some cases, be carrying nuclear warheads.

Following years of debate, which slowed development of the base, the 1991 dissolution of the Soviet Union led to a major cutback in military spending, and the still incomplete base was cancelled in 1993. Shortly thereafter, a plan was floated to build a race-track on the site, to be primarily used by NASCAR. The plan was quickly forgotten. Also headquartered at the site is one of three fireboats, FDNY Marine company 9. The site is now also used as part of the annual Fleet Week in New York City. After sitting empty for a couple of years, the base site was used by a bagel manufacturer briefly. Then a proposal was made to have a movie studio occupy a 6-acre (2.4 ha) portion of the site. For never-explained reasons the city administration opposed this, and finally some of the civil courts took over a small part of the site, leaving most unused while various proposals were made for housing, parkland, and an educational complex, among others.

On October 26, 2006, the New York City Council approved a massive redevelopment plan for the site. It will be transformed into a new community with 350 housing units, restaurants, parks, a recreation center and farmers' market. The City Council pushed the project through its final regulatory hurdle when it approved the $66 million blueprint for the former Navy base. The city will use the money and an additional $1.1 million state grant to create streets, utilities and a mile-long waterfront esplanade while soliciting proposals from private developers to build on six sites—three residential and three commercial—across the 36-acre (15 ha) base. City officials have said infrastructure work could begin in early 2007 with a projected completion date of 2009. Demolition of the old Navy buildings began in late 2011.

On October 29, 2012, Hurricane Sandy threw the tanker John B. Caddell ashore on a vacant part of Front Street.

== Demographics ==
For census purposes, the New York City Department of City Planning classifies Stapleton as part of a larger Neighborhood Tabulation Area called Tompkinsville-Stapleton-Clifton-Fox Hills SI0102. This designated neighborhood had 19,027 inhabitants based on data from the 2020 United States Census. This was an increase of 2,835 persons (17.5%) from the 16,192 counted in 2010. The neighborhood had a population density of 34.2 inhabitants per acre (14,500/sq mi; 5,600/km^{2}).

The racial makeup of the neighborhood was 15.8% (3,006) White (Non-Hispanic), 31.7% (6,031) Black (Non-Hispanic), 9.6% (1,828) Asian, and 4.2% (799) from two or more races. Hispanic or Latino of any race were 38.7% (7,363) of the population.

According to the 2020 United States Census, this area has many cultural communities of over 1,000 inhabitants. This include residents who identify as Mexican, Puerto Rican, African-American, and Chinese.

The largest age group was people 10-34 years old, which made up 37% of the residents. 65.0% of the households had at least one family present. Out of the 13,141 households, 30.5% had a married couple (14.0% with a child under 18), 6.7% had a cohabiting couple (3.1% with a child under 18), 24.8% had a single male (2.4% with a child under 18), and 38.0% had a single female (12.0% with a child under 18). 37.7% of households had children under 18. In this neighborhood, 71.2% of non-vacant housing units are renter-occupied.

The entirety of Community District 1, which comprises Stapleton and other neighborhoods on the North Shore, had 181,484 inhabitants as of NYC Health's 2018 Community Health Profile, with an average life expectancy of 79.0 years. This is lower than the median life expectancy of 81.2 for all New York City neighborhoods. Most inhabitants are youth and middle-aged adults: 24% are between the ages of between 0–17, 27% between 25 and 44, and 26% between 45 and 64. The ratio of college-aged and elderly residents was lower, at 10% and 13% respectively.

As of 2017, the median household income in Community District 1 was $48,018, though the median income in Stapleton individually was $58,373. In 2018, an estimated 21% of Stapleton and the North Shore residents lived in poverty, compared to 17% in all of Staten Island and 20% in all of New York City. One in fourteen residents (7%) were unemployed, compared to 6% in Staten Island and 9% in New York City. Rent burden, or the percentage of residents who have difficulty paying their rent, is 51% in Stapleton and the North Shore, compared to the boroughwide and citywide rates of 49% and 51% respectively. Based on this calculation, as of 2018, Stapleton and the North Shore are considered high-income relative to the rest of the city and not gentrifying.

=== Culture ===
The portions of the neighborhood around the Stapleton Houses have been predominantly Black for a while (though there has always been a noticeable White and Hispanic presence), while the areas further away have been a little bit more diverse. The overall neighborhood has seen a decrease in the White population, which reflects the overall trend of Whites moving back towards the city center (as well as those moving to newer suburbs further out). The local school, P.S. 14 (which has since become P.S. 78 due to P.S. 14's failing as a school) has seen a large increase in the Hispanic population, with the 2011–2012 school year being the first one in which Hispanics have made up the majority of the student body. This is reflective of the overall increase in the Hispanic population in the area.

== Community ==
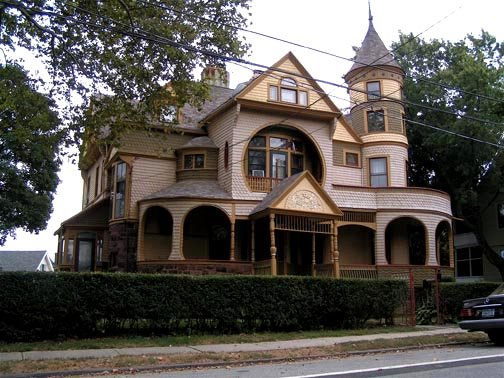
A Victorian home in Stapleton.

Stapleton, like much of the North Shore, has two major coexisting cultural spheres: that based in the old, standalone homes that have been in the area since the Victorian era, and that based in the public housing projects. As such, it is just as common to find Spanish bodegas and vibrant street art as winding roads, used book stores, and coffee shops.

In October 1980, the Paramount Theater began hosting acts such as The B-52s, Talking Heads, Squeeze, the Dead Kennedys, Burning Spear and the Ramones, but it ceased functioning as a concert hall by the late 1980s. Other former venues include Beer Goggles and Martini Red, which is now known as The Hop Shoppe. The NYC Arts Cypher is located on Broad Street, and occasionally hosts hip-hop concerts, which distinguishes it from most other local venues, which cater mainly to rock and alternative bands.

In recent years, the extreme sports scene has boomed on Staten Island. In July 2012, 5050 Skatepark was opened on Front Street across from the Homeport. 5050 Skatepark is New York City's only indoor skatepark, and one of the few skateparks open to BMX bikes, skateboarder, scooters, and rollerblades.

The neighborhood also has a diverse selection of restaurants. These include an American-style diner, a Gastropub, Lakruwana, a Sri Lankan restaurant, and Mexican and Italian eateries. Chain restaurants also have a presence.

=== Points of interest ===
In 1801, the local Union American Methodist Episcopal church was founded in the neighborhood. It still stands at 43 Tompkins Avenue and has a very active congregation, most of whom are descendants of former slaves on Staten Island. The church is the oldest African-American church in the borough and one of four which predate the 20th century.

Edgewater Village Hall and Tappen Park, the old village hall of Stapleton, was added to the National Register of Historic Places in 1980.

In addition to the Edgewater Village Hall and Tappen Park, the Boardman–Mitchell House, Houses at 364 and 390 Van Duzer Street, and St. Paul's Memorial Church and Rectory are listed on the National Register of Historic Places.

== Police and crime ==
Stapleton and the North Shore are patrolled by the 120th Precinct of the NYPD, located at 78 Richmond Terrace. The 120th Precinct ranked 12th safest out of 69 patrol areas for per-capita crime in 2010. As of 2018, with a non-fatal assault rate of 94 per 100,000 people, Stapleton and the North Shore's rate of violent crimes per capita is more than that of the city as a whole. The incarceration rate of 719 per 100,000 people is higher than that of the city as a whole.

The 120th Precinct has a lower crime rate than in the 1990s, with crimes across all categories having decreased by 83.3% between 1990 and 2022. The precinct reported seven murders, 14 rapes, 118 robberies, 384 felony assaults, 124 burglaries, 338 grand larcenies, and 136 grand larcenies auto in 2022.

== Fire safety ==
Stapleton is served by the New York City Fire Department (FDNY)'s Engine Co. 153/Ladder Co. 77, located at 74 Broad Street.

== Health ==
As of 2018, preterm births and births to teenage mothers are more common in Stapleton and the North Shore than in other places citywide. In Stapleton and the North Shore, there were 96 preterm births per 1,000 live births (compared to 87 per 1,000 citywide), and 22.6 births to teenage mothers per 1,000 live births (compared to 19.3 per 1,000 citywide). Stapleton and the North Shore have a relatively average population of residents who are uninsured. In 2018, this population of uninsured residents was estimated to be 12%, the same as the citywide rate of 12%.

The concentration of fine particulate matter, the deadliest type of air pollutant, in Stapleton and the North Shore is 0.0071 milligrams per cubic metre (7.1×10^{−9} oz/ft^{3}), less than the city average. Sixteen percent of Stapleton and the North Shore residents are smokers, which is higher than the city average of 14% of residents being smokers. In Stapleton and the North Shore, 24% of residents are obese, 9% are diabetic, and 26% have high blood pressure—compared to the citywide averages of 24%, 11%, and 28% respectively. In addition, 21% of children are obese, compared to the citywide average of 20%.

Eighty-seven percent of residents eat some fruits and vegetables every day, which is the same as the city's average of 87%. In 2018, 77% of residents described their health as "good", "very good", or "excellent", equal to the city's average of 78%. For every supermarket in Stapleton and the North Shore, there are 28 bodegas.

The nearest major hospitals are Richmond University Medical Center in West New Brighton and Staten Island University Hospital in Dongan Hills.

== Post office and ZIP Codes ==
Stapleton is located within the ZIP Code 10304, south of Clinton Street and 10301, north of Clinton Street. The United States Postal Service operates the Stapleton Station post office at 160 Tompkins Avenue.

== Education ==
Stapleton and the North Shore generally have a lower rate of college-educated residents than the rest of the city as of 2018. While 37% of residents age 25 and older have a college education or higher, 15% have less than a high school education and 48% are high school graduates or have some college education. By contrast, 39% of Staten Island residents and 43% of city residents have a college education or higher. The percentage of Stapleton and the North Shore students excelling in math rose from 49% in 2000 to 65% in 2011, though reading achievement declined from 55% to 51% during the same time period.

Stapleton and the North Shore's rate of elementary school student absenteeism is slightly higher than the rest of New York City. In Stapleton and the North Shore, 25% of elementary school students missed twenty or more days per school year, more than the citywide average of 20%. Additionally, 73% of high school students in Stapleton and the North Shore graduate on time, about the same as the citywide average of 75%.

=== Schools ===
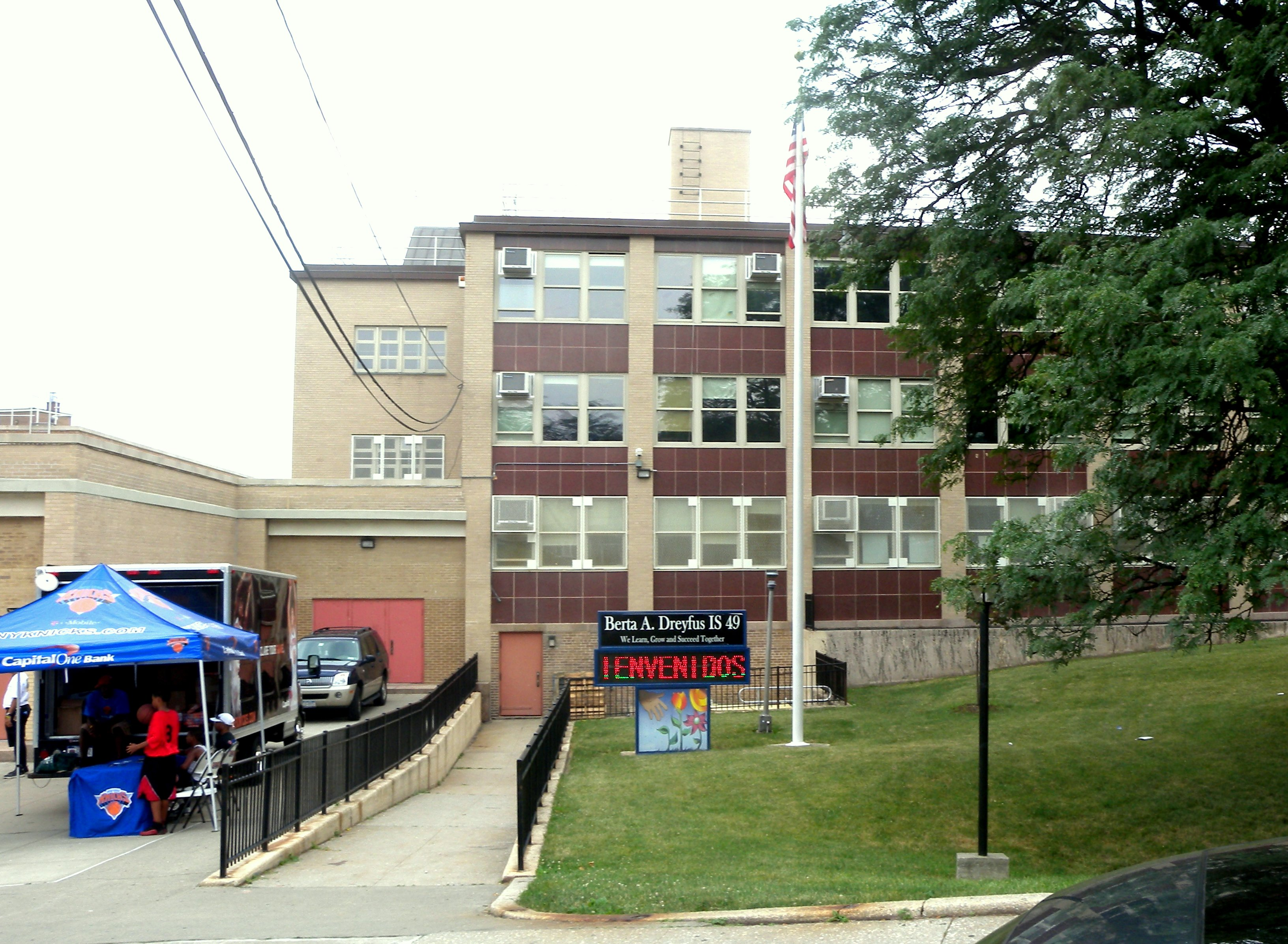
Dreyfus Intermediate School

The New York City Department of Education operates the following public schools in Stapleton:

- IS 49 Bertha A Dreyfus (grades 6–8)
- PS 65 the Academy of Innovative Learning (grades PK-5)

The Roman Catholic Archdiocese of New York operates Staten Island Catholic schools. Immaculate Conception School in Stapleton closed in 2013. The archdiocese stated that the number of students was too low and that the school could not receive enough income. It had 216 students in 2013.

=== Library ===
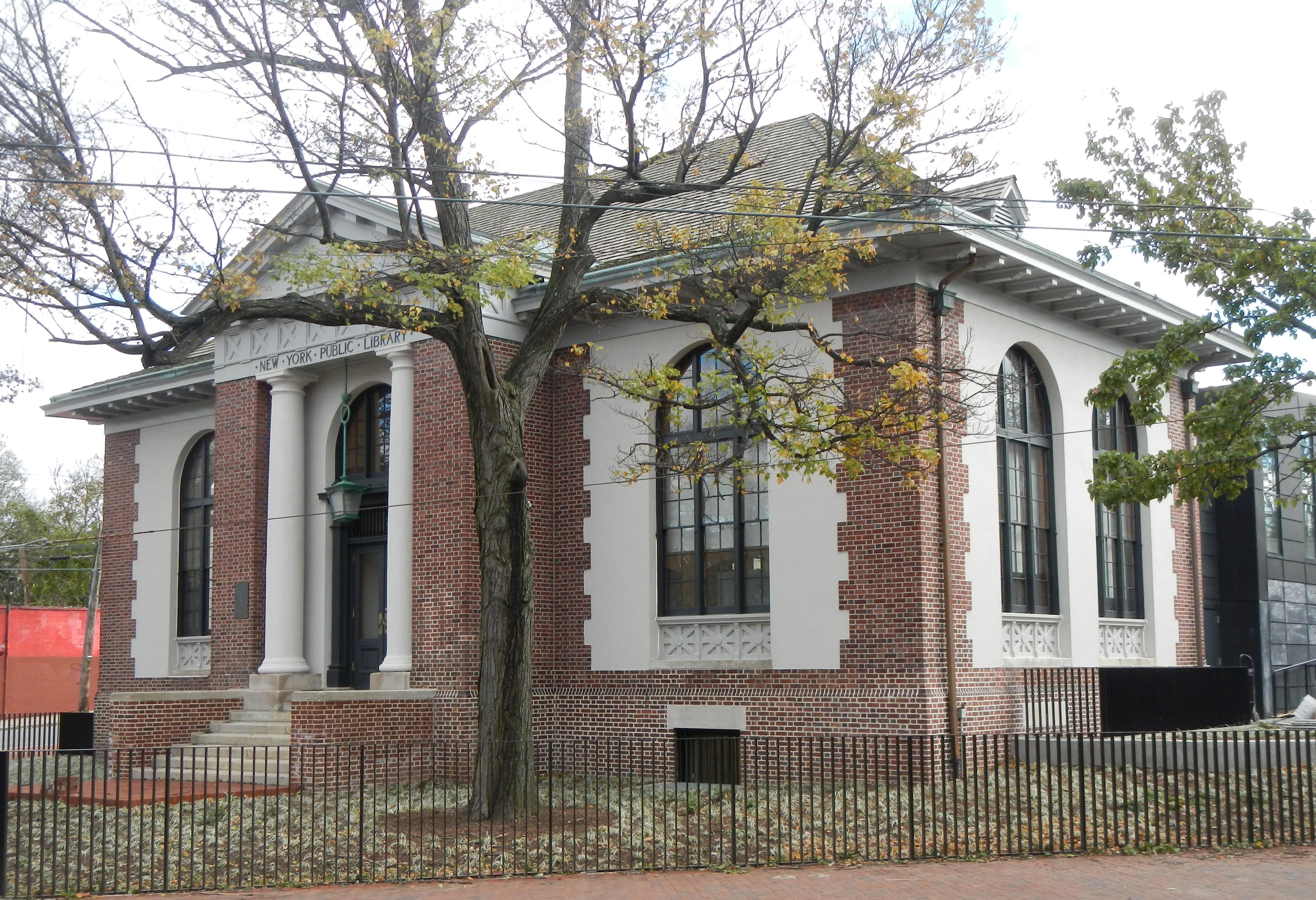
New York Public Library, Stapleton branch

The New York Public Library (NYPL)'s Stapleton branch is located at 132 Canal Street at Wright Street. The Carrere & Hastings-designed Carnegie library was built in 1907. It underwent significant renovations and remodeling from 2011 to 2013, including the addition of a 7,600-square-foot (710 m^{2}) building. A minor controversy arose over the discrepancy of architectural styles between the modernist black-glass addition and the original structure.

== Transportation ==
Due to its proximity to the Staten Island Ferry, Stapleton is well served by public transportation. The Staten Island Railway has a station of the same name at Prospect Street and Bay Street. Stapleton is also served by the S51, S52, S74, S76, S78, S81, S84 and S86 local buses. Express bus service to and from Manhattan is provided by the SIM30 route.

== Notable people ==
- Dennis Coles, a.k.a. Ghostface Killah, rapper of the Wu-Tang Clan
- Andrew Juxon-Smith, head of Sierra Leone military government 1967–1968
- John Palmer, Secretary of State of New York 1894–1898
- Kenny Washington, jazz drummer who grew up in the Stapleton Houses
- Mack Wilds, R&B/Hip-Hop singer and actor who grew up in the Stapleton Houses

== See also ==
- List of Staten Island neighborhoods
