= Stapleton Houses =

Public housing development in Staten Island, New York

- NYCHA property
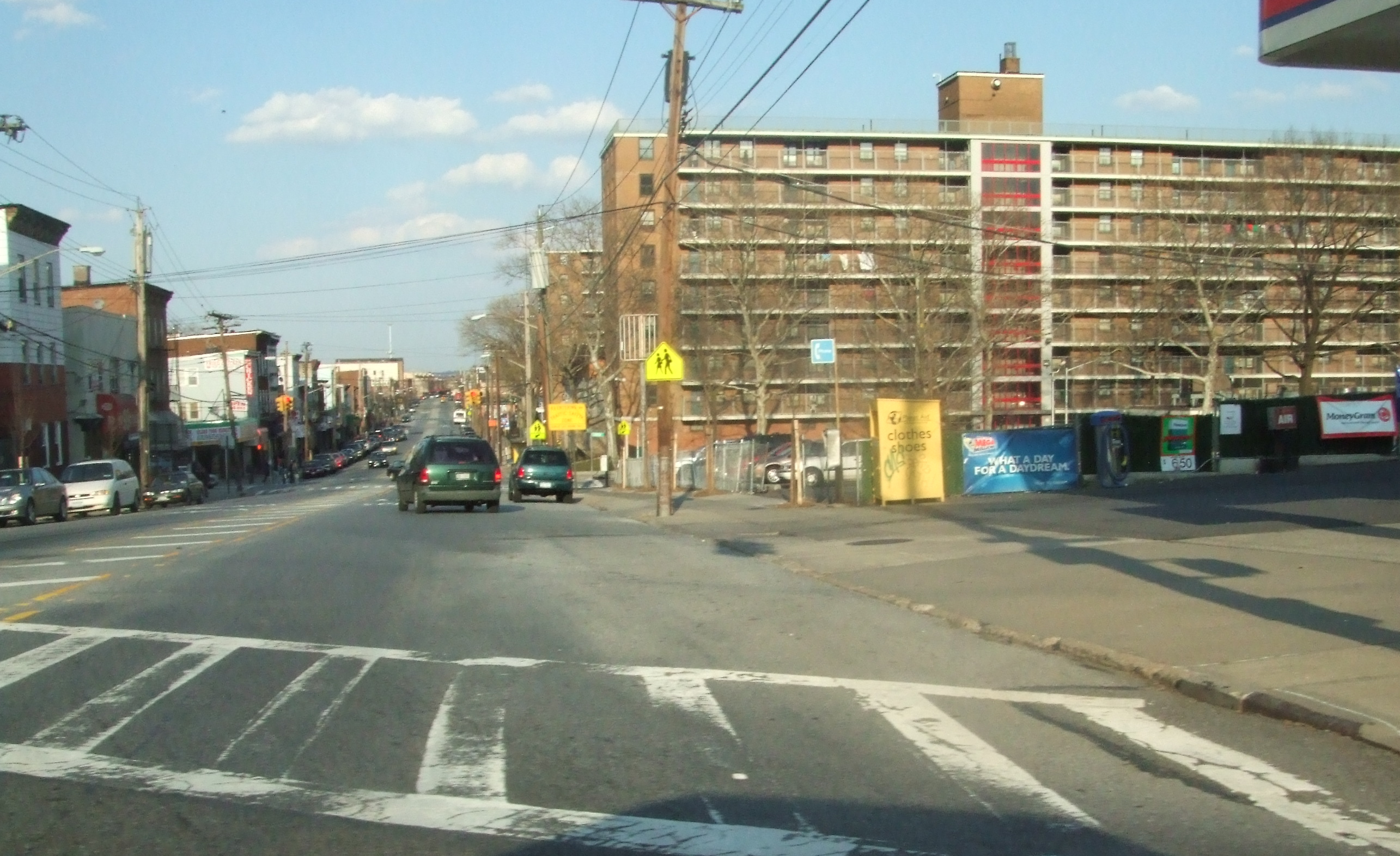
- Nickname: Stapleton
- Location within New York City
- Coordinates: 40.6224°N 74.0815°W
- Country: United States
- State: New York
- City: New York City
- Borough: Staten Island
- ZIP codes: 10304
- Area codes: 718, 347, 929, and 917

The Stapleton Houses are a housing project in the Stapleton neighborhood of Staten Island, New York City. The project consists of six 8-story buildings with 693 apartment units. It covers 16.87 acres (6.83 ha) and is bordered by Tompkins Avenue, and Broad, Hill, Warren and Gordon Streets. It is owned and managed by New York City Housing Authority (NYCHA) and is the largest NYCHA development in Staten Island.

== Development ==
The Stapleton Houses, which began construction in 1959, were designed by architects Ballard, Todd & Snibbe. Each building was designed to be long and narrow and with outdoor galleries to remove interior corridors. Facilities on the site include three playgrounds, lounge, meeting rooms, childcare center and a covered garden terrace. The development was completed on May 31, 1962.

In the 1980s, the development saw the rise of the crack epidemic, and with that a rise in crime. Crime declined in the 1990s, but violence did not and the houses are now home to a large array of security cameras.

== Notable residents ==
- 9th Prince (born 1977), rapper of Killarmy
- Ghostface Killah (born 1970), rapper of the Wu-Tang Clan
- RZA (born 1969), rapper and leader of the Wu-Tang Clan
- Kenny Washington (born 1958), jazz drummer
- Mack Wilds (born 1989), R&B/Hip-Hop singer and actor
- Ronell Wilson (born 1982), convicted of the 2003 murder of two undercover New York City police officers
- Shyheim (born 1977), rapper.

== See also ==
- List of New York City Housing Authority properties
