= Metropolitan Detention Center, Brooklyn =

Federal detention facility in Brooklyn, New York

Coordinates: 40°39′37″N 74°00′16″W

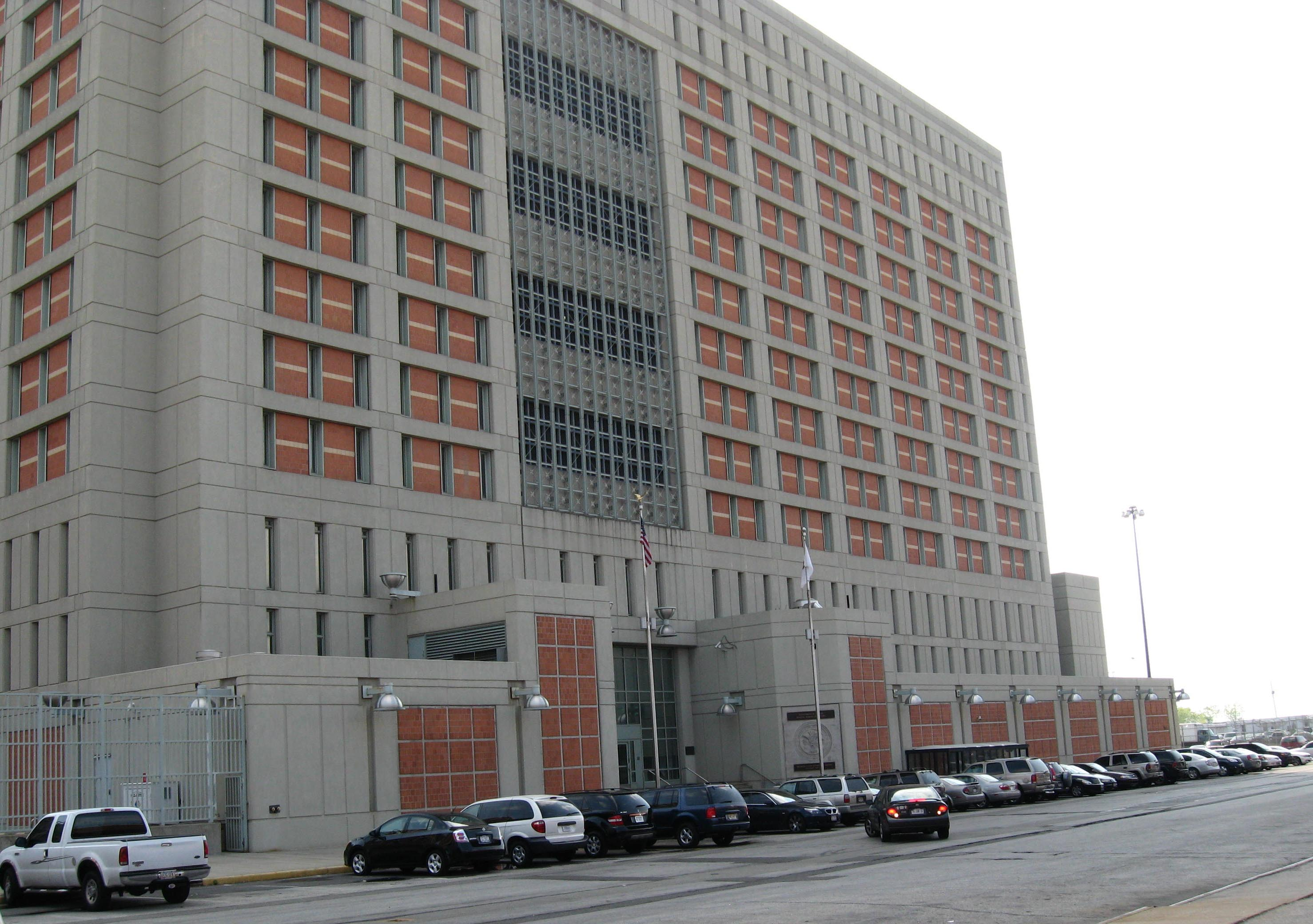
- MDC Brooklyn in 2008
- Interactive map of Metropolitan Detention Center, Brooklyn
- Location: 80 29th Street Brooklyn, NY 11232
- Status: Operational
- Security class: Administrative facility (all security levels)
- Population: 1,336
- Managed by: Federal Bureau of Prisons
- Warden: Raul Maldonado Jr.
- Website: Official website

The Metropolitan Detention Center, Brooklyn, also MDC Brooklyn, is a United States federal administrative detention facility in the Sunset Park neighborhood of Brooklyn, New York City, New York, United States. It holds male and female inmates of all security levels. It is operated by the Federal Bureau of Prisons, a division of the United States Department of Justice.

As of February 2026, 1,408 people were held in MDC Brooklyn. Most people held at MDC Brooklyn have pending cases in the United States District Court for the Eastern District of New York. MDC Brooklyn also holds prisoners serving brief sentences.

== History ==
MDC Brooklyn occupies land that was originally part of Bush Terminal (now Industry City), a historic intermodal shipping, warehousing, and manufacturing complex. The Federal Bureau of Prisons initially proposed converting two buildings at Industry City into a federal jail in 1988, due to overcrowding at the Metropolitan Correctional Center, New York. There was large opposition from members of the local community, who feared that traffic congestion in the area would rise. Critics feared that the facility, with its staff, inmates, visitors, and supply deliveries, would overburden neighborhood traffic and water and sewer systems. To make room for MDC Brooklyn, one of the original Bush Terminal loft buildings—Federal Building No. 1, formerly occupied by the United States Coast Guard—was demolished in a controlled explosion in August 1993.

MDC Brooklyn opened in January 1994. It was built to hold 1,000 inmates awaiting arraignment or trial at the federal court in the Eastern District of New York. By 2019, according to The New York Times, it held 1,600 inmates.

In November 1999, a second facility was opened next to the original complex to house inmates who have been sentenced and are awaiting transfer to a permanent facility. This brought the total number of inmates to close to 3,000 and made MDC Brooklyn the largest detention center in the United States.

In June 2015, a lawsuit filed in 2002 against high-ranking officials of George W. Bush's presidential administration, including former Attorney General John Ashcroft and former F.B.I. Director Robert S. Mueller III, brought by eight, mostly Muslim immigrant detainees, was allowed to go forward by a three-judge federal panel. It alleged that the plaintiffs were subject to chronic arbitrary abuses including beatings, strip searches and solitary confinement. The Second Circuit Court of Appeals decision included one dissent.

In 2019, former warden Cameron Lindsay said, "The M.D.C. was one of the most troubled, if not the most troubled facility in the Bureau of Prisons."

In September 2024, the Federal Bureau of Prisons confirmed that federal defendants entering the prison system after sentencing will no longer be sent to MDC Brooklyn. This decision is possibly related to a previous ruling by a Federal Court judge who threatened to vacate a man's sentence if he was sent to MDC Brooklyn due to the "dangerous, barbaric conditions" of the jail. The same month, rapper and record producer Sean "Diddy" Combs was incarcerated at the prison's Special Housing Unit.

In early 2026, an investigation by Rolling Stone revealed the institution imposes extended lockdowns, offers inadequate medical care, and subjects inmates to poor conditions including that some inmates go weeks without seeing the sky.

One of Ghislaine Maxwell's lawyers said that MDC Brooklyn had mistreated Maxwell during her time there. She was searched 1,400 times, even though no contraband was ever found. Despite Maxwell saying she was not suicidal, she had a flashlight shone when she was supposed to be sleeping every 15 minutes, therefore disrupting her sleep. Furthermore, Maxwell's food was heated in a container that was not for microwave use, causing things like the food blending into the plastic.

Inside MDC Brooklyn's administrative maximum (ADMAX) Special Housing Unit (SHU). Photos dated May 1, 2002.

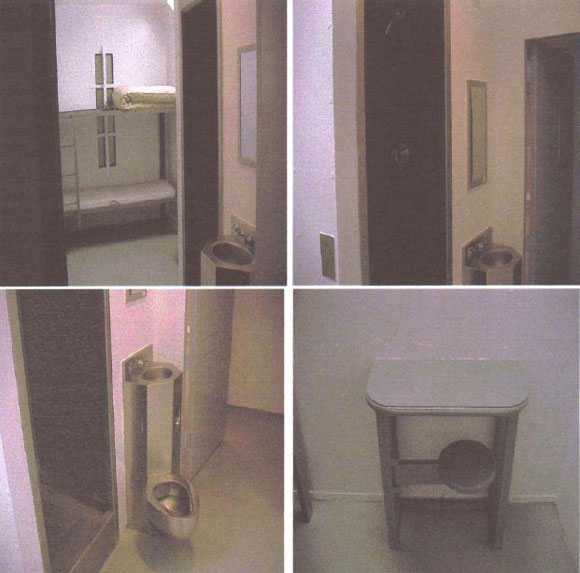
Typical ADMAX SHU cell showing (clockwise from top left) the bunk bed, shower, seating area, and combination toilet and sink fixture.

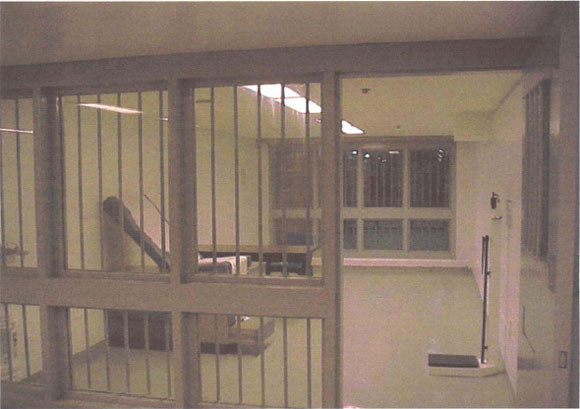
A Multipurpose room equipped for detainee medical examinations.

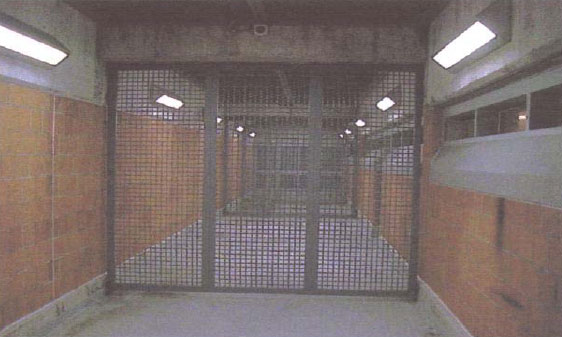
Recreation cells as viewed from the last recreation cell.

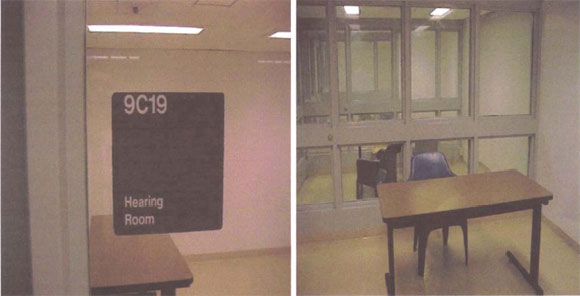
Two views of the contact visiting area.

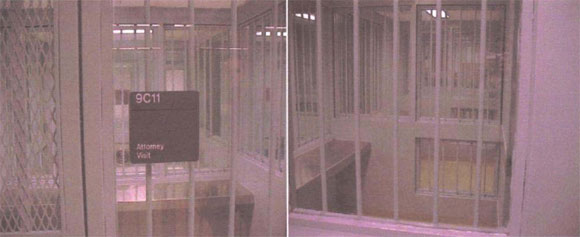
Two views of the non-contact visiting area used by September 11 detainees.

== Immigration detention ==
=== 2001–2002 investigative detention ===
During the sweeping investigation of non-citizens that followed the September 11 attacks, the United States government detained 762 foreign nationals, 60% of them in the New York City metropolitan area. 84 detainees were held at the Metropolitan Detention Center between September 14, 2001, and August 27, 2002. Those detained in the investigation were placed in the highly isolated Secure Housing Unit, limited to a single outside phone call per month, one call with lawyers per week, and subjected to what the Department of Justice's Office of Inspector General determined was "a pattern of physical and verbal abuse."

=== 2025 – ICE facility ===
The Metropolitan Detention Center began holding immigrant men detained by the Immigration and Customs Enforcement (ICE) in June 2025 under a February 6, 2025, agreement between ICE and the US Bureau of Prisons. The ICE presence in the prison expanded to a second cell block in February 2026.

== Notable incidents ==
=== Extraordinary rendition ===
In September 2006, Canadian engineer Maher Arar was arrested at John F. Kennedy International Airport while flying home from a vacation in Tunisia and held for two weeks in solitary confinement at MDC Brooklyn. The US government suspected him of being a member of Al Qaeda and deported him, not to Canada, his current home and the passport on which he was travelling, but to Syria. He was detained in Syria for almost a year, during which time he was tortured by Syrian authorities, according to the findings of a commission of inquiry ordered by the Canadian government, until his release to Canada. The Syrian government later stated that Arar was "completely innocent."

=== Inmate assault ===
On June 29, 2009, Ronald Atkinson (62416–054), an inmate at MDC Brooklyn who had been arrested in connection with six bank robberies 12 days earlier, committed an allegedly unprovoked assault on a correctional officer, repeatedly punching him in the head until he was restrained by correctional officers. The officer, whom the Bureau of Prisons did not identify, suffered a broken nose, broken facial bones, a fractured eye socket, a laceration requiring stitches, and two slipped discs in his neck. An 18-year veteran of the Bureau of Prisons, the officer was forced to retire as a result of his injuries.

Atkinson was sentenced to seven years in federal prison for the bank robberies. On July 19, 2013, he was sentenced to an additional 12 years in prison for the assault. Currently held at USP Coleman I in Sumter County, Florida, Atkinson is scheduled for release in 2032.

=== Ronell Wilson ===
On February 5, 2013, New York media outlets reported that Nancy Gonzalez, a former federal correction officer, had engaged in a sexual relationship with Ronell Wilson, an inmate at MDC Brooklyn, and that Gonzalez was carrying Wilson's child. Wilson, who was convicted and sentenced to death in 2007 for the 2003 murders of NYPD Detectives Rodney Andrews and James Nemorin, was awaiting a resentencing hearing in Brooklyn federal court after his original death sentence was overturned in 2010, when he began a relationship with Gonzalez. Gonzalez was terminated and arraigned in federal court on charges of sexual abuse of a person in custody, because an inmate cannot legally consent to sex. Wilson was subsequently transferred to the Metropolitan Correctional Center in Manhattan. Gonzalez pleaded guilty to unlawful sexual abuse of a ward on July 3, 2013. Gonzalez was sentenced to a year and a day by Federal Judge Brian Cogan on February 9, 2014. Cogan remarked, "[Gonzalez has] severe emotional dysfunction".

Wilson was sentenced to death again on September 10, 2013. During the hearing, US District Court Judge Nicholas Garaufis called for a formal investigation by the Justice Department's inspector general into the management of MDC Brooklyn, where, he said, Mr. Wilson was "permitted to treat the MDC as his own private fiefdom."

=== Winter 2019 heat and power outages ===
In January and February 2019, over 1,600 inmates were kept with little to no heat and power for a week during the January 2019 North American cold wave. Numerous inmates reported ill health and were seen banging on windows for help. Activists and some New York officials sought to improve conditions. The incident started on the weekend of January 26–27 with a power outage. A faulty electrical panel was repaired but caught fire the next day. Power was restored on the evening of February 3, and the Department of Justice planned to investigate the incident. Inmates, family members, and lawyers have said that those inmates involved in protesting these harsh conditions through non-violent disobedience and hunger strikes faced draconian reprisals from jail staff, including being pepper-sprayed, subjected to solitary confinement, and having toilets shut off. According to a report in The Intercept:

On all three of those housing units where men collectively refused food, jail staff shut off the valves to the toilets in all of the cells, according to accounts relayed to lawyers. Confined to their cells on lockdown, deprived of light, the men on these units now found themselves shivering on their bunks with their heads inches from toilet bowls nearly overflowing with festering feces.

== Notable current inmates ==
Inmate Name	Register Number	Photo	Status	Details
El Mayo	27102-511		Sentenced to life imprisonment on July 20, 2026.	Leader of the Sinaloa Cartel; oversaw trafficking of cocaine and heroin into the United States.
Nicholas Cosmo	49193-053		Serving a 25-year sentence; scheduled for release on November 18, 2030.	Pleaded guilty to fraud for stealing over $365 million from thousands of investors during a 5-year Ponzi scheme; known as the "Mini-Madoff;" Cosmo's story was featured on the CNBC television program American Greed.
Ronald Washington	68635-053		Serving a sentence for drug possession and robbery; brought to New York to stand trial for murder.	Accused of the murder of Run-DMC DJ Jam Master Jay in 2002; charged in 2020.
Karl Jordan Jr.	05124-509		Acquitted of murder charges; awaiting trial on related drug charges.	Accused of the murder of Run-DMC DJ Jam Master Jay in 2002; charged in 2020.
Luigi Mangione	52503-511		Held awaiting trial.	Charged with stalking for the killing of Brian Thompson.
Rafael Caro Quintero	12303-016		Held awaiting trial. Extradited to MDC Brooklyn from Mexico on February 27, 2025.	Former leader of the now defunct Guadalajara Cartel, responsible for the kidnapping of United States Drug Enforcement Administration (DEA) agent Enrique "Kiki" Camarena, Camarena's pilot Alfredo Zavala Avelar, the American writer John Clay Walker, and dentistry student Alberto Radelat in 1985.
Tal Alexander	50978-511		Held awaiting sentencing, scheduled for August 6, 2026	Tal and Oren Alexander are luxury real estate agents. In December 2024, they were charged with sex trafficking alongside their brother Alon.
Oren Alexander	52667-511		Held awaiting sentencing, scheduled for August 6, 2026	Tal and Oren Alexander are luxury real estate agents. In December 2024, they were charged with sex trafficking alongside their brother Alon.
Alon Alexander	52665-511		Held awaiting sentencing, scheduled for August 6, 2026	Tal and Oren Alexander are luxury real estate agents. In December 2024, they were charged with sex trafficking alongside their brother Alon.
Nicolás Maduro	00734-506		Held awaiting trial.	Maduro served as the president of Venezuela from 2013 until his capture in January 2026 during US intervention in Venezuela, after which he was transported to MDC to await trial for narcoterrorism charges. (Note: His status as president has been unclear since a 2026 military operation resulting in his capture and removal to the United States of America for trial; see § Capture. He remains the constitutional president, while Delcy Rodríguez de facto functioning his presidential powers as acting president.)
Cilia Flores	00735-506		Held awaiting trial.	Wife of Nicolás Maduro and former First Lady of Venezuela from 2013 to 2026; charged with drug trafficking.
Mohammad Baqer Saad Dawood al-Saadi	51081-506		Held awaiting trial.	Charged for plotting or being involved in terrorist attacks in Europe and North America, including targeting a synagogue in New York City and Los Angeles, as well as other Jewish sites during the 2026 London antisemitic attacks, in retaliation to the 2026 Iran war.

== Notable former inmates ==
Inmate Name	Register Number	Photo	Status	Details
6ix9ine	86335-054		Held at MDC Brooklyn November 18-21, 2018 before being transferred to a different facility; released to home confinement on April 2, 2020. Served an additional three-month sentence at MDC Brooklyn for probation violations; released from custody on April 3, 2026.	Rapper, real name Daniel Hernandez, convicted of racketeering and firearm offenses. Hernandez was sentenced in 2019 to two years in prison. In December 2025, Hernandez was sentenced to three additional months in prison for violating his probation by possessing drugs and committing assault.
Juan Orlando Hernández	91441-054		Transferred to USP Hazelton. Sentenced to 45 years; released from custody on December 1, 2025 after being pardoned by President Donald Trump.	Former President of Honduras from 2014 to 2022. In April 2022, Hernández was extradited to the United States, where he was charged with conspiracy to import cocaine into the US. Hernández was accused of accepting millions of dollars in bribes from drug cartels, supplying weapons to protect drug shipments, and selectively extraditing drug traffickers who threatened his power. In June 2024, he was sentenced to 45 years in prison. In December 2025, Hernández was pardoned by President Donald Trump. He returned to Honduras in July 2026.
Genaro García Luna	59745-177		Transferred to ADX Florence. Serving a 38 year sentence; scheduled for release on December 7, 2051.	Former Secretary of Public Security of Mexico; arrested in Dallas, Texas in December 2019 for taking millions in bribes from the Sinaloa Cartel. In October 2024, García Luna was sentenced to 38 years in prison for engaging in a criminal enterprise, international drug trafficking, and making false statements.
Ronell Wilson	71460-053		Transferred to MCFP Springfield. Serving a life sentence.	Gang leader in Staten Island, New York; murdered NYPD Detectives James Nemorin and Rodney Andrews, who were conducting a sting operation to buy an illegal gun in 2003. Wilson was initially on death row before having his sentence reduced to life without parole on the grounds of that he was mentally disabled.
Sayfullo Saipov	79715-054		Transferred to ADX Florence. Serving ten life sentences plus 260 years.	Perpetrator of the 2017 New York City truck attack, in which he killed eight people and injured thirteen others. Convicted in 2023 of murder, assault, and attempted murder in support of ISIS as well as providing material support to a foreign terrorist organization.
Frank James	83999-053		Transferred to ADX Florence. Serving a life sentence.	Perpetrator of the 2022 New York City Subway attack; sentenced to ten concurrent life sentences for shooting and injuring ten people in a New York City Subway car in Sunset Park, Brooklyn.
Sam Bankman-Fried	37244-510		Transferred to FCI Lompoc I. Serving a 25 year sentence; scheduled for release on June 2, 2044.	Founder of the cryptocurrency exchange FTX; convicted of wire fraud, wire fraud conspiracy, securities fraud, securities fraud conspiracy, and money laundering.
Vincent Basciano	30694-054		Transferred to USP Florence High. Serving two consecutive life sentences.	Former boss of the Bonanno Crime Family in 2004 after Boss Joseph Massino was arrested; convicted in 2006 of murder, conspiracy and racketeering; convicted in 2011 of ordering the 2004 murder of Bonanno associate Randolph Pizzolo.
Joseph Massino	Unlisted		Released July 10, 2013. Sentenced to two life sentences; later commuted to time served and supervised release.	Former Bonanno crime family boss convicted in 2004 of racketeering, extortion, arson, loan sharking, illegal gambling, money laundering, and seven murders, including that of Dominick Napolitano. Facing the death penalty, he became a federal informant and testified against fellow mobster Vincent Basciano for ordering the murder of Bonnano associate Randolph Pizzolo. After testifying, Massino entered the Federal Witness Protection Program and died on September 14, 2023.
Allison Mack	90838-053		Released after posting $5 million bond on April 24, 2018.	Actress; pled guilty in 2019 to racketeering and racketeering conspiracy as part of NXIVM cult. Sentenced in 2021 to 3 years' imprisonment, served at FCI Dublin.
R. Kelly	09627-035		Transferred to FCI Butner. Serving a 31-year sentence; scheduled for release on January 31, 2046.	Former R&B singer; convicted of racketeering, violations of the Mann Act, producing child pornography, sex trafficking, and child exploitation.
Fetty Wap	71943-509		Transferred to FCI Sandstone. Sentenced to 72 months; released early on January 8, 2026.	Rapper and singer; pleaded guilty in 2022 to conspiracy to possess and distribute controlled substances.
Frank Cali	75768-053		Served ten months; released from custody on April 6, 2009.	Alleged acting boss of the Gambino crime family at the time of his death in 2019. In 2008, then-soldier Cali was arrested for extortion and sentenced to 16 months in federal prison.
Martin Shkreli	87850-053		Transferred to FCI Allenwood Low. Released on May 18, 2022 after serving a seven year sentence.	Former CEO of Turing Pharmaceuticals; convicted in 2017 of securities fraud; his bail was revoked after he made a Facebook post offering his followers $5,000 for Hillary Clinton's hair.
Vincent Asaro	83223-053		Sentenced to eight years; granted compassionate release on April 20, 2020.	Former caporegime in the Bonanno crime family. Asaro was found guilty in a vehicle arson case.
Keith Raniere	57005-177		Transferred to FCI Butner. Serving a 120-year sentence; scheduled for release on June 27, 2120.	Founder of the NXIVM sex cult. Convicted in 2019 for two counts of sex trafficking, racketeering, forced labor conspiracy, attempted sex trafficking, and wire fraud conspiracy.
Linda Weston	68897-066		Transferred to FMC Carswell. Serving a life sentence.	Indicted in 2013 for murder, racketeering, hate crimes and other charges for leading a group who held mentally disabled individuals against their will between 2001 and 2011 in order to steal their Social Security benefits, two of whom died as a result of abuse. She was sentenced to life in prison.
Abid Naseer	05770-748		Transferred to MCFP Springfield. Serving a 40-year sentence; scheduled for release January 15, 2035.	Alleged Al-Qaeda operative; extradited from the United Kingdom in 2012 to face charges that he took part in an international conspiracy to conduct bombings in the United States and Europe; sentenced in 2015 to 40 years; three co-conspirators were convicted in 2010 and 2012.
Jeffrey Atkins	04526-748		Served 28 months; released on May 7, 2013.	Rapper known as Ja Rule; sentenced in 2008 to two years in prison for attempted criminal possession of a weapon after police found a firearm with a defaced serial number in his car. In 2011, Atkins was given a concurrent sentence of 28 months after he was convicted of three counts of failing to file tax returns.
Caswell Senior	20180-509		Transferred to FCI Victorville. Serving a 188 month sentence; scheduled for release on June 30, 2034.	Rapper known as Casanova; convicted in 2023 of racketeering, firearm possession, and conspiracy to distribute controlled substances.
Gene Borrello	89749-053		Served a six-month sentence; released on September 9, 2023.	Former associate of the Bonanno crime family; sentenced for breaching the terms of his supervised release for his previous convictions of leading a home invasion crew in Howard Beach, Queens. He had become a government witness and testified against other Bonnano members, including Vincent Asaro. He had broken the terms of his release by appearing on multiple mafia related podcasts and continuing to associate with other former mafia members.
Paul Nicholas Miller	32607-509		Released July 3, 2023. Served a 41-month sentence.	American far-right political commentator and streamer known online as "Gypsy Crusader". In 2021, he was convicted of possessing a firearm and ammunition as a convicted felon and possessing an unregistered rifle; Miller, a white supremacist, admitted to purchasing rifle parts and ammunition in preparation for a coming race war.
Al Sharpton	21458-069		Served a 90-day sentence; released on August 17, 2001.	Baptist minister, political activist and current MSNBC television host; convicted of trespassing on federal property for protesting against the US military presence on the island of Vieques, Puerto Rico.
Megan Rice	88101-020		Released on April 16, 2015. Served more than two years of a two-year sentence. Initially sentenced to three years, released after conviction for one charge was vacated.	Anti-nuclear activist and Roman Catholic nun; convicted in 2013 of sabotage for unlawfully entering the Y-12 National Security Complex and vandalizing a facility housing weapons-grade uranium.
Michael Cohen	86067-054		Released July 2020. Released less than one month after being arrested for violating the conditions of his release from FCI Otisville.	Former Trump Organization lawyer. Pled guilty in 2018 tax evasion, making false statements to a financial institution, willfully causing an unlawful corporate contribution, an excessive campaign contribution, making false statements to a congressional committee.
Ghislaine Maxwell	02879-509		Transferred to FPC Bryan. Serving a 20-year sentence; scheduled for release on July 17, 2037.	Close associate to Jeffrey Epstein convicted in 2021 of child sex trafficking. Maxwell was held in MDC Brooklyn while awaiting trial.
Sean Combs	37452-054		Transferred to FCI Fort Dix. Serving a 50-month sentence; scheduled for release January 24, 2028.	Rapper, record producer and record executive, known professionally as Diddy and formerly P. Diddy and Puff Daddy. He was arrested in September 2024 and charged with sex trafficking and racketeering. Combs was convicted on 2 counts of transportation to engage in prostitution in 2025.
Guo Wengui	49134-510		Transferred to FCI Danbury. Serving a 30-year sentence; scheduled for release on October 6, 2048.	Former Chinese businessman. convicted on various charges of wire fraud, securities fraud, bank fraud, and money laundering.
Anthony "Harv" Ellison	86282-054		Transferred to USP Canaan. Serving a 24-year sentence; scheduled for release January 12, 2042.	Member of the Nine Trey Gangsters; orchestrated the kidnapping and robbery of rapper 6ix9ine in 2018.
Austin Wolf	22682-511		Transferred to FCI Seagoville. Serving a 19-year sentence; scheduled for release on July 2, 2040.	Wolf, whose real name is Justin Heath Smith, is a gay adult film star and content creator. He was arrested in June 2024 and charged with possessing and distributing hundreds of videos of child pornography.

== See also ==
- List of U.S. federal prisons
- Federal Bureau of Prisons
- Incarceration in the United States
