= Charlie Balducci =

American actor (1975–2020)

- Born: August 29, 1975
- Died: July 25, 2020 (aged 44); Staten Island, New York, U.S.
- Occupation: Actor
- Years active: 1998–2020

Charlie Balducci (August 29, 1975 – July 25, 2020) was an American actor. He appeared on a 2002 episode of MTV's True Life entitled "I'm Getting Married," which documented his wedding to Sabrina. Balducci also owned a non-profit arts organization in Staten Island that offers programs to aspiring artists. He earned a bachelor's degree in psychology from St. John's University in 1998.

== NYC Arts Cypher ==
In 2006, Balducci founded the NYC Arts Cypher, a non-profit community center that acts as a hub for aspiring artists in various mediums. According to the center's website, the center has taken up social problems such as bullying and drug abuse to help shed light on and stamp out these issues. NYC Arts Cypher showcased young artist's work in graffiti, break dancing, and old school events, competitions and art shows.

== Death ==
Balducci died at his home in Staten Island, New York on July 25, 2020, at age 44 of "acute intoxication" from a deadly cocktail of the prescription drugs Oxycodone, hydrocodone and Alprazolam. His family stated that he had health issues and took an accidental mix of prescription medication that caused his heart failure. Charlie Balducci and his wife Sabrina were separated at the time of his death. They had two sons, Louis, 19 and CJ, 17. His mother stated that his last words to her were that "he’s happy to have his boys.” Charlie's final tweet encouraged people to remember that life is not guaranteed, and that it is our duty to make the most of each day

== Filmography ==
- 2002: MTV True Life

Charlie Balducci-Charlie B produced a documentary with his non-profit NYC ARTS CYPHER that won best documentary short in the 2010 Staten Island Film Festival.

He was also featured with his wife Sabrina on a 20/20 special in January 2013 that looked back on their episode of True Life.

Balducci performed as the role of a talk show host in Derrick Simmom's film "Nobody's Perfect," and was narrator of the film "Staten Island," and he also appeared on the soap opera "All My Children."
