= Lakruwana =

Restaurant information
- Established: 1994
- Food type: Sri Lankan cuisine
- Location: Staten Island, New York, United States

Lakruwana is a Sri Lankan restaurant in Staten Island.

== History ==
The restaurant was founded in Manhattan in 1994, but later moved to Staten Island, and began operating in its current location in Stapleton in 2010.

In 2017, Julia Wijesinghe, the daughter of Lakruwana's owners, opened a museum focused on Sri Lankan culture in the restaurant's basement.

== Reviews and accolades ==
Lakruwana has been included on lists of the 100 best restaurants in New York City published by The New York Times in 2023, 2024, and 2025.

The Infatuation included the restaurant on a 2024 list of the best restaurants on Staten Island.
