= Ronell Wilson =

American convicted of murder (born 1982)

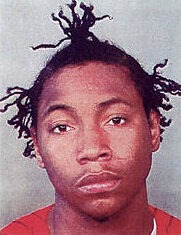
- Wilson's booking photo
- Born: May 4, 1982 (age 44); New York, U.S.
- Children: 1
- Status: Incarcerated
- Convictions: Murder in aid of racketeering (2 counts); Carjacking resulting in death; Use of a firearm during a crime of violence resulting in death (2 counts); Conspiracy to commit robbery (2 counts); Attempted robbery; Use of a firearm during a crime of violence (2 counts)
- Penalty: Death; commuted to life imprisonment

Details
- Victims: James V. Nemorin, 36; Rodney J. Andrews, 34
- Date: March 10, 2003
- Country: United States
- State: New York
- Location: Staten Island, New York
- Imprisoned at: MCFP Springfield

Ronell Earl Wilson (born May 4, 1982) is an American murderer who was convicted of the 2003 capital murder of two undercover New York City police officers in Staten Island, New York. His trial before Judge Nicholas Garaufis of the United States District Court for the Eastern District of New York began on November 27, 2006. On December 20, 2006, he was found guilty of the capital murders as well as other related charges. On January 30, 2007, Wilson was sentenced to death, the first such sentence by a federal jury in New York since the federal death penalty was reinstated in 1988.

== Criminal activity ==
=== Murder trial ===
Prosecutors alleged Wilson was the leader of a violent drug gang called the Stapleton Crew (witnesses at the trial denied using that label) that originated in the Stapleton Houses, a public housing complex in Staten Island. He was convicted for murdering New York City Police Department detectives James Nemorin and Rodney Andrews in a gun sale, then searching their bodies and stealing their car. The victims' family members and fellow police officers greeted pronouncement of his death sentence with cheers and applause; Wilson reacted by sticking his tongue out in their direction.

The case has attracted media attention due to the brutality of the murders and the rarity of a capital prosecution in New York. Wilson was the first federal defendant sentenced to death in New York City since 1954. Wilson was originally charged in New York state court, but the federal government took over the prosecution after the New York Court of Appeals held, in People v. LaValle, that the state's death penalty statute violated the New York State Constitution. Wilson was held at the United States Penitentiary in Terre Haute, Indiana.

=== Appeals ===
In 2010, the United States Court of Appeals for the Second Circuit reversed Wilson's sentence. In the sentencing phase, the prosecutor "argued: [i] that Wilson put the government to its proof of guilt rather than plead guilty; and [ii] that Wilson's allocution of remorse should be discredited because he failed to testify notwithstanding the fact that "the path for that witness stand has never been blocked for Mr. Wilson." As to the first argument, although a guilty plea may properly be considered to support a sentence mitigation for acceptance of responsibility, the Sixth Amendment is violated when failure to plead guilty is treated as an aggravating circumstance. As to the second, it is a fair argument for the prosecution to say that an allocution of remorse is unsworn and uncrossed, but the Fifth Amendment is violated when the defendant is denied a charge that limits the Fifth Amendment waiver to that which is said in the allocution and the jury is invited to consider more generally that the defendant declined to testify." Because these constitutional violations were not harmless beyond a reasonable doubt, the court vacated Wilson's and his co-defendants' death sentences and remanded to the trial court for re-sentencing. The government's petition for rehearing en banc was denied on October 19, 2010.

After the court of appeals vacated Wilson's death sentence, Wilson moved from the United States Penitentiary, Terre Haute, to the Metropolitan Detention Center, Brooklyn. While in the MDC, he fathered a child with Federal Officer Nancy Gonzalez during an illicit rendezvous in the staff bathroom on July 15, 2012. On March 22, 2013, Gonzalez gave birth to a son they named Justus. While the relationship itself was consensual, Gonzalez faced federal charges for sexual abuse of a person in custody since Wilson legally could not consent to sex as an inmate. Gonzalez pleaded guilty and was sentenced to one year and one day in prison.

The prosecutor in the original case, Jack Smith, served as chief of the Public Integrity Section of the Department of Justice and was appointed as the special counsel investigating Donald Trump in 2022.

On July 24, 2013, a Brooklyn federal jury sentenced Wilson to death for the 2003 murders, reinstating the previous death sentence that was thrown out in 2010. During his direct appeal, the Second Circuit Court of Appeals had remanded the case to the district court with direction to reconsider, in light of an intervening Supreme Court case, the district court's earlier ruling that Wilson is not intellectually disabled.

On March 15, 2016, Judge Garaufis concluded that Wilson is mentally handicapped, making him ineligible for execution under the Eighth Amendment. Federal prosecutors later announced they would not appeal this ruling. Wilson was resentenced to life in prison without parole. As of 2026, Wilson is serving his sentence at MCFP Springfield in Springfield, Missouri.

== See also ==
- Capital punishment by the United States federal government
