= NYC Arts Cypher =

The NYC Arts Cypher is a non-profit organization that was founded in 2006 by Charlie Balducci with the intention of creating a safe place for the youth of New York City to express themselves and detour them from crime. Since its inception the NYC Arts Cypher has hosted various events that have raised awareness to issues such as bullying, prescription drug abuse, 9/11, vandalism, and more. The organization offers creative services, from video production to event planning. The center is a 501c3 non-profit organization and is funded primarily from the creative services they offer. Their second largest source of revenue is their annual Halloween haunted house.

== Location ==
The NYC Arts Cypher services all of New York City, but it is located in the Stapleton neighborhood of Staten Island on Broad Street.

== Aftermath of Hurricane Sandy ==
Due to Hurricane Sandy in 2012, the center was unable to host their annual Halloween fundraiser, which raised questions of whether the center would be able to continue to keep its doors open.

The center was able to come together and hosted “I Heart NYC Arts Cypher” on Valentine's Day 2013 to offset the loss from Hurricane Sandy.

== Awards ==
In 2010, the NYC Arts Cypher was awarded “best documentary short” at the Staten Island Film Festival for their documentary, "M.U.R.A.L". The film took a glimpse into the world of graffiti art, the artists behind it, and addressed the misconceptions and stereotypes behind the art form.
