= Elizabeth Niespolo =

Geologist

Elizabeth M. Niespolo
- Education: PhD, University of California, Berkeley (2019); MS, California State University, Long Beach (2014); BA, University of California, Berkeley
- Known for: Tracing human activity with ostrich egg shells, Geochronology of natural materials from archaeological sites, High precision isotopic dating of volcanic minerals
- Scientific career
- Fields: Geology, geochemistry, archaeology
- Workplaces: Princeton University
- Theses: Mineralogy, geochemistry, and stable isotopes of Guatemalan jadeitites: A new method to determine the provenance of Mesoamerican jade artifacts (2014); Determining Timescales and Paleoenvironments of Quaternary Human Evolution Using Stable and Radiogenic Isotopes (2019)
- Doctoral advisor: Paul Renne
- Other academic advisors: Gregory Holk

Elizabeth Niespolo is an American geologist. Her work utilizes geochemical methods to understand archaeological sites and human activity on multiple continents. Niespolo integrates laboratory and field work studying natural materials such as ostrich egg shells, corals, and minerals in rocks to quantify potential human environmental signatures preserved in these materials and their relevance in piecing together understanding of Homo sapiens through time. In the absence of archaeological sites, Niespolo uses high precision isotopic dating of minerals from volcanoes to determine their petrologic and eruptive history.

== Early life and education ==
Niespolo was a first generation college student when she started her studies at the university level and chose to pursue a path integrating science, the Earth, and human history. She earned her undergraduate degree, a Bachelor of Arts, with a double major from the University of California, Berkeley in Berkeley, California. One major she chose in the humanities, Classics, and one major she chose in the sciences, Astrophysics.

During her undergraduate studies, she was drawn towards ancient history. Pursuing this initial inclination she worked for some archaeologists in the classics department to get a feel for what archaeology entailed. Part of this work included on-site field work in Greece where she found herself drawn to natural materials such as soils and fossils, their story, and how their stories were intertwined with the archaeological deposits. This interest morphed into realizations about natural resources and how things including drywall in houses and cell phone electrical circuits, chips, and battery components are partially made of earth materials requiring mining and quarrying to extract from the Earth and put into everyday use. She pursued additional field work in Italy where she worked on pottery from Pompeii and saw Mount Vesuvius, which piqued her interest in volcanoes and their interactions with human civilizations. This theme of human civilization interactions with natural processes became a theme in the course of her graduate studies.

=== Graduate studies in geology ===
Niespolo began her graduate studies in geology at California State University, Long Beach in Long Beach, California focusing her thesis work on the minerals in and geochemical signatures of jadeitites from Guatemala. These signatures she used to develop a new way of finding where Mesoamerican jade artifacts originated from. As part of her research she worked at a Mayan archaeological site in Chiapas, Mexico. Her efforts at California State University, Long Beach both on-campus and in the field in Mexico earned her a Master of Science, MS, degree.

After completing her MS, Niespolo continued her graduate studies in geology by pursuing a Doctor of Philosophy, PhD, at the University of California, Berkeley. Her work was split into two settings: on-campus laboratory work including activities such as taking geochemical measurements and on-location field work in various locations including the East African Rift Valley. In 2019 Niespolo finished and filed her dissertation and earned her PhD from the University of California, Berkeley. Niespolo's dissertation focused on using both stable and radiogenic isotopes to determine the geochronology and environmental context of human evolution in the past, the Quaternary specifically.

== Career ==
=== 2010s: The Americas, Polynesia, and Africa beginnings ===
Niespolo started integrating her archaeological experience with her physics background through geochemical dating methods based on fundamental nuclear physical reactions and radioactive decay chains in the chemical elements. Her physics background also came through in instrumentation she used to measure both radioactive and stable isotope abundances including mass spectrometry. Isotopic abundances became a center of her work on jadeitites from Guatemala, Central America. Her emphasis was on finding ways to fingerprint natural materials used by humans to make tools and artwork so the origin of these artifacts and the materials used in their construction can be pin-pointed. She has also emphasized the importance of jade sourcing in terms of economics in the Mayan Empire. As part of this work, Niespolo was a recipient of a research grant in 2014 from the Geological Society of America.

Niespolo furthered her experience working with natural minerals focusing on volcanic sanidine from northern California. This work provided high precision dating to aid in understanding petrologic and eruptive processes that may have been preserved in minerals erupted in the Alder Creek rhyolite during the early Pleistocene.

Radiometric dating of corals from the Cook Islands in Polynesia Niespolo pursued to aid in providing precise dates for human arrival and inhabitation of the island of Mangaia in Polynesia. As islands in Polynesia were not originally inhabited by humans, precise geochemical dating can help to provide precise timelines for human arrival and colonization of the islands as well as the non-native plants humans brought with them. Specifically, Niespolo found that coral abraders contained chemical evidence in the form of Thorium that Polynesians arrived to Mangaia by 1011.6 ± 5.8 CE and sweet potatoes arrived by 1361-1466 CE.

Following her work on natural materials from Central America, North America, and Polynesia, Niespolo broadened her scope geographically by honing in on piecing together what past physical and chemical environments were like in Africa. The goal with her work being correlating geochemical findings with archaeological sites to understand the timing of new tool development, human evolution, and human migration in relation to the land around them. Part of why Niespolo chose to pursue geochronology was her interest in understanding past human evolution in response to changing environmental conditions that may be helpful in modern times to understand potential environment changes in response to human activity.

Foundational work on this topic for Niespolo included geochemical measurements of stable isotopes providing understanding of rainfall and vegetation variability in Eastern Africa during the Pleistocene-Holocene. This work provided environmental context for archaeological sites in Eastern Africa in the form of stable isotope abundances from ostrich egg shells and was funded by a $199,496 grant from the National Science Foundation.

=== 2020s: Africa continues and professorship ===
Niespolo draws inspiration in her geology work from past geologist Charles Lyell emphasizing that to understand the present the past is particularly pertinent. Niespolo narrows this point down in an interview with Scientific American, "Geology is the direct means to understanding our resources, and we use natural resources for literally everything (your house, your drinking water, energy). If we don't know the geologic processes controlling these observable resources, we will be hard pressed to continue utilizing them safely and responsibly, and developing more sustainable resource use in the future."

In April 2021, Niespolo's research from leading a group of scientists in investigating marine resource overuse in South Africa during the Middle Stone Age and providing high precision dating to correlate Homo sapiens resource use with sea level change in the area was published in the Proceedings of the National Academy of Sciences. Specifically, the study expanded her use of isotopic dating of ostrich egg shells, this time utilizing a ^{230}Thorium/Uranium burial dating, to remains from an archaeological site near modern day Cape Town and found the deposit of dated remains accumulated between 113,000 and 120,000 years before the study. The study also found inhabitants of the archaeological site continued maintaining a consistent diet even as sea level dropped following a high stand of the sea, which was attributed to selective foraging by the inhabitants in part due to an increase in aridity over the dated time period.

The same month, Princeton University announced that Niespolo was one of 10 new faculty members approved by Princeton University's Board of Trustees. Her faculty appointment began in the autumn of 2021 at the assistant professor level. In 2022, her further expansion of her geochronology expertise in assessing human-climate dynamics in the past was published in a collaborative study investigating tool and technology development in relation to changes in wind intensity and rainfall around 80,000 to 92,000 years before the published 2022 study in what is modern day South Africa, to which she contributed uranium-series dating of natural materials.

== Personal ==
Niespolo is a proponent of female mentorship in science disciplines and participates in organizations such as Bay Area Scientists in Schools.

== See also ==
- 2021 in mammal paleontology
- Kondoa Rock-Art Sites
- Polynesian navigation
