= Allison Mack =

American actress (born 1982)

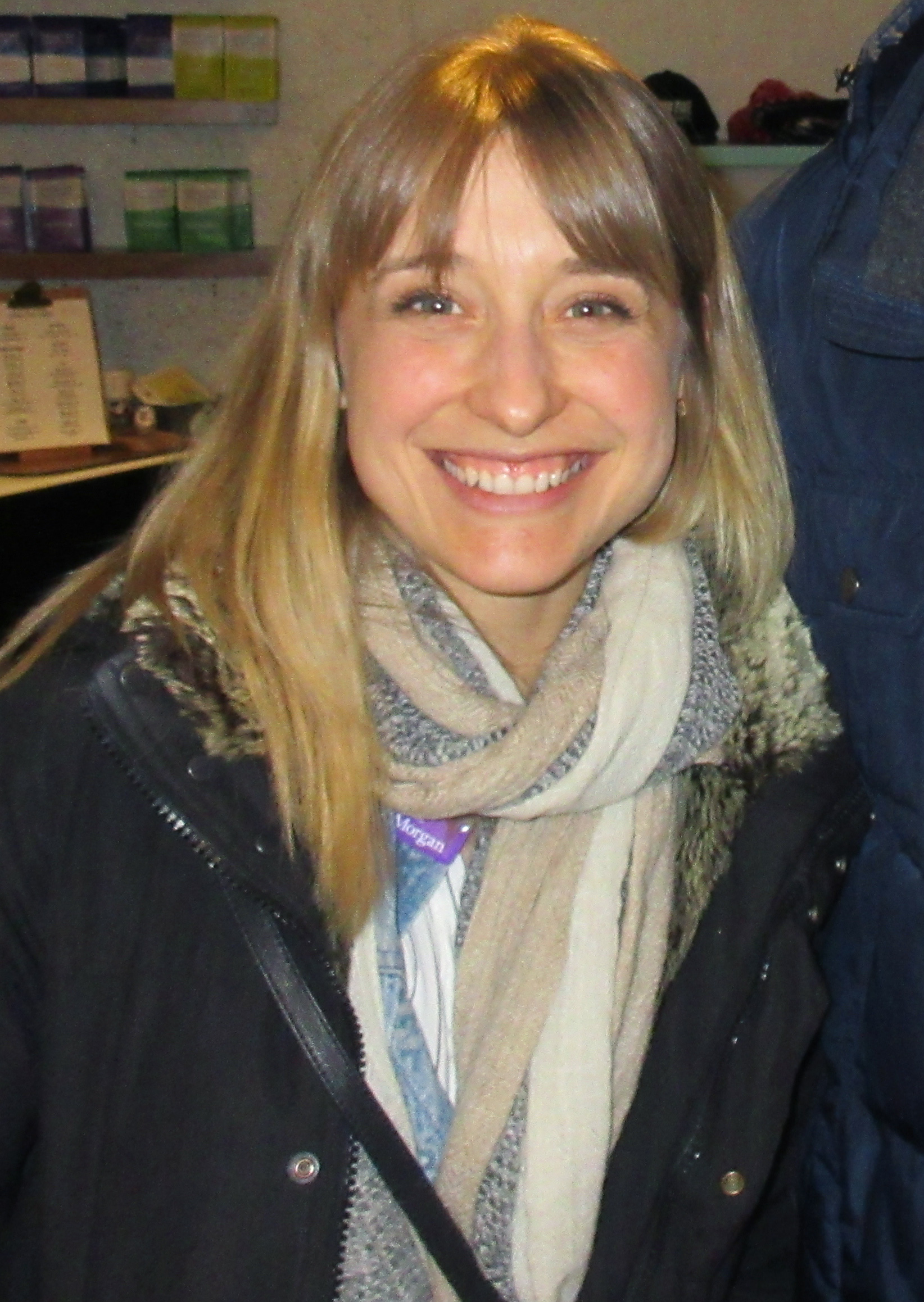
- Mack in New York City, 2018
- Born: July 29, 1982 (age 44); Preetz, Schleswig-Holstein, West Germany
- Occupation: Actress
- Years active: 1989–2016
- Criminal charges: Racketeering and racketeering conspiracy
- Criminal penalty: 3 years imprisonment
- Criminal status: Released from FCI Dublin; on probation.
- Spouses: Nicki Clyne (m. 2017; div.); Frank Meeink (m. 2025)

Allison Mack (born July 29, 1982) is an American former actress. She played Chloe Sullivan on the superhero series Smallville (2001–2011) and had a recurring role on the comedy series Wilfred (2012–2014).

Mack was a member of NXIVM, a sex-trafficking cult and multi-level marketing company. In 2018, she was arrested by federal authorities on charges of sex trafficking, sex-trafficking conspiracy, and forced labor conspiracy related to her involvement in NXIVM and its subgroup, DOS. Mack pleaded guilty to racketeering and racketeering conspiracy charges and, in 2021, was sentenced to three years in prison. She served 22 months at the Federal Correctional Institution, Dublin, California, and was released in July 2023.

== Early life ==
Allison Mack was born on July 29, 1982, in Preetz, West Germany, to American parents Jonathan Mack, an opera singer, and Mindy Mack, a schoolteacher and bookkeeper. She has an older brother. Her parents were in West Germany at the time of her birth because Jonathan was performing there; they lived in West Germany for two years before returning to the United States, settling in Long Beach, California, where Mack was raised.

== Career ==
=== Early work ===
Mack's first job was for a German chocolate company in a series of print ads and commercials. She went into modeling for a short period and studied at the Young Actors Space in Los Angeles at age seven.

Mack's first major television role was in an episode of the WB/CW series 7th Heaven, in which she gained attention playing a teenager who cut herself. In 2000, she co-starred in the short-lived series Opposite Sex. Her film credits include roles in My Horrible Year! (Eric Stoltz's directorial debut), Camp Nowhere, and in the Disney film Honey, We Shrunk Ourselves.

=== Smallville ===
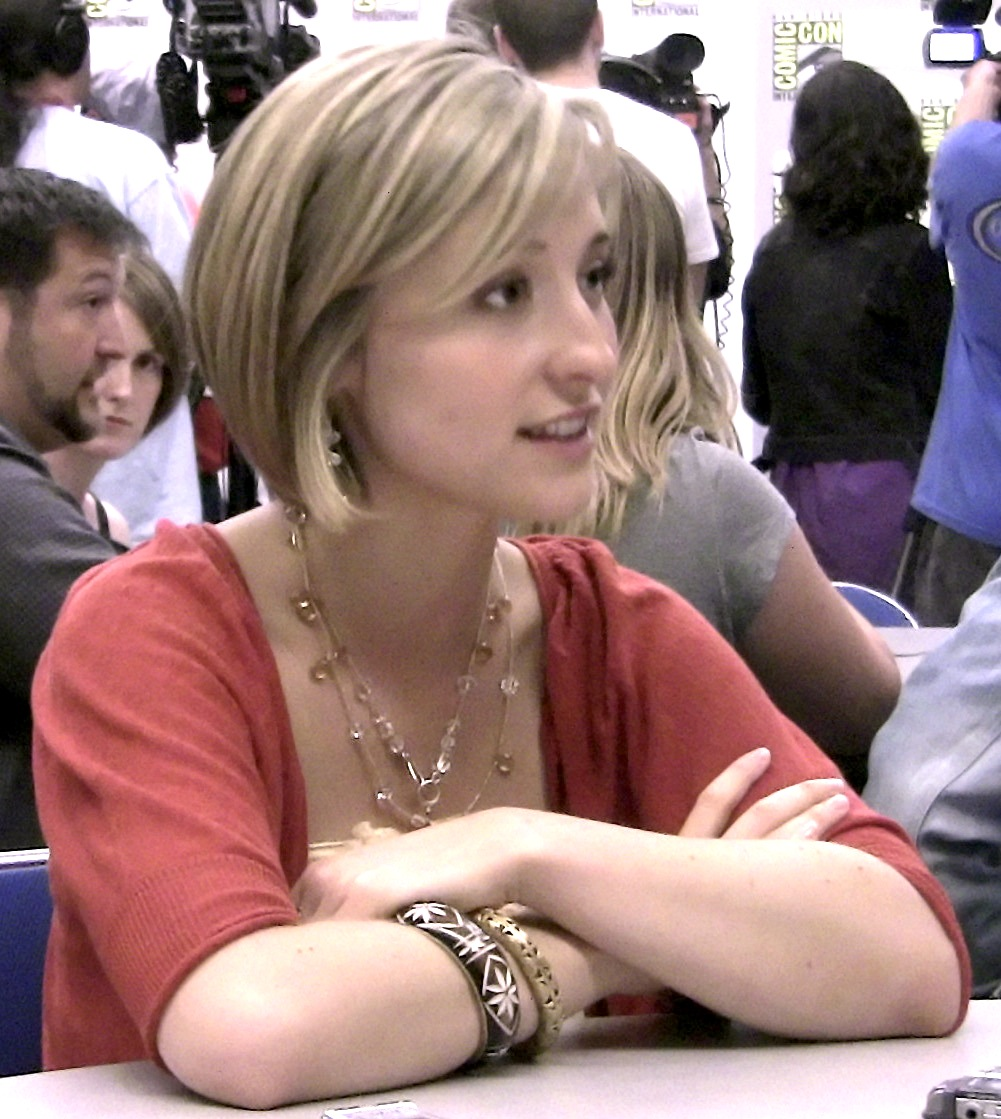
Mack at the 2009 San Diego Comic-Con

In October 2001, Mack began starring as Chloe Sullivan (an original character created for the show), one of Clark Kent's best friends in the WB/CW television series Smallville. Mack earned several awards and nominations for her portrayal of Chloe, including the Teen Choice Award for Best Sidekick in 2006 and 2007. She appeared as a series regular for nine seasons and returned as an intermittent main cast member in the tenth and final season, including the two-part series finale. From 2003 to 2006, Mack's character appeared in her own miniseries Smallville: Chloe Chronicles and Smallville: Vengeance Chronicles. In 2008, Mack made her directorial debut in Smallville season 8 episode "Power".

In 2002, Mack made a couple of appearances along with her Smallville castmate Sam Jones III in R. L. Stine's miniseries The Nightmare Room. In 2006, she voiced Clea, a museum curator, in an episode of The Batman. Adding to her DC Comics resume, she lent her voice for Power Girl in the animated feature Superman/Batman: Public Enemies (2009). Mack was also listed as a member of the Iris Theatre Company.

=== After Smallville ===
In March 2012, Mack was cast in a recurring role in the second season of the FX sitcom Wilfred. She played Amanda, the love interest of Elijah Wood's lead character Ryan. Mack returned to Wilfred for one episode of the fourth and final season. In 2014, Mack guest-starred as a policewoman named Hilary in an episode of the Fox thriller The Following. On March 21, 2015, she tweeted that she would be appearing in American Odyssey as Julia, who befriends Suzanne, the daughter of Anna Friel's lead character Sgt. Odelle Ballard.

== Involvement with NXIVM and fallout ==
Mack was a member of NXIVM, an organization founded by cult leader Keith Raniere and headquartered in Albany, New York. Throughout its existence, advocates of NXIVM characterized it as a benign multi-level marketing company selling professional and personal development courses, while critics described it as a cult.

=== NXIVM and DOS ===
Mack joined NXIVM in 2006 after attending a two-day introduction to "Jness", a women's group within NXIVM, eventually becoming a high-ranking member of the organization. Mack was co-creator of "The Source", a NXIVM program that recruited actors. She was also a member of "Simply Human", an a cappella NXIVM singing group, and the emcee of "A Cappella Innovations", a multi-day festival. Hosted by NXIVM in 2007 and 2008, the events were billed as a university singing showcase and were alleged to be "a front to draw impressionable undergrads into NXIVM."

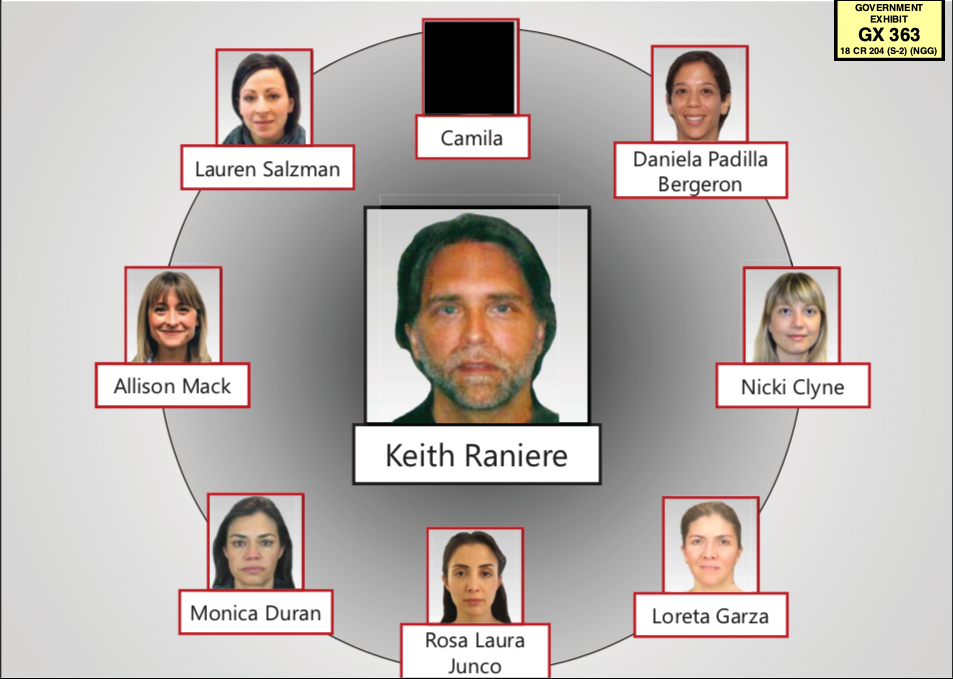
United States v. Keith Raniere prosecution exhibit depicting DOS first-line masters

In 2015, Raniere created a secret subgroup within NXIVM called "Dominus Obsequious Sororium" (DOS), of which Mack was allegedly second-in-command. DOS was structured as a pyramid group with Raniere at the top (and the only man in DOS) with subordinates including Mack and others as Raniere's first-line DOS masters. DOS was ostensibly built around female empowerment but mainly provided a means to traffic women for Raniere's gratification. According to prosecutors, Mack and others recruited women by telling them they were joining a women-only organization that would empower them, with Raniere's status as the leader of DOS concealed from new recruits. As a pre-condition for joining DOS, women were required to provide "collateral", which included nude photographs, damaging information about family and friends, and rights to their assets. Recruits were told their collateral could be released if they left DOS or told anyone about DOS's existence. Recruits were also controlled in several other ways, including requirements to seek permission, physical isolation, forced participation in "readiness drills", sleep deprivation, extremely restrictive diets, and being subject to corporal punishment.

Mack reportedly recruited four women into DOS, including India Oxenberg, daughter of actress Catherine Oxenberg. As directed by Raniere, Mack and others required their recruits to be branded with a symbol representing Raniere's initials, with the branding ritual following a script created by Raniere. Mack's recruits were unaware that the brand was composed of Raniere's initials, and said that Mack had told them that the brand was a symbol of the elements: air, earth, fire, and water. Former NXIVM member Sarah Edmondson stated in a 2017 New York Times exposé and a 2018 A&E special on cults details about DOS that she had been branded in an initiation ceremony at Mack's house. In a New York Times interview, Mack claimed that the human branding was her idea.

=== Arrest and conviction ===
The indictment of Mack and other NXIVM members

On April 20, 2018, Mack was arrested by the FBI in Brooklyn on charges of sex trafficking, sex trafficking conspiracy, and forced labor conspiracy. The federal indictment accused Mack of "recruiting women to join what was purported to be a female mentorship group that was, in fact, created and led by Keith Raniere." Mack was one of the "top members of a highly organized scheme which was designed to provide sex to [Raniere]." Prosecutors accused Mack of concealing Raniere's status as the leader of DOS as she coaxed recruits to provide highly damaging personal information, nude photos, and rights to personal assets. After Mack recruited women to join DOS, "under the guise of female empowerment, she starved women until they fit [Raniere's] sexual feminine ideal." Mack directly or implicitly required her recruits to engage in sexual activity with Raniere. In exchange, Mack received financial and other benefits from Raniere.

On April 24, 2018, Mack was released from Metropolitan Detention Center, Brooklyn on a $5 million bond and held under house arrest under the custody of her parents in California. During Mack's arraignment proceedings, prosecutors also accused her of entering a sham marriage with Nicki Clyne to help Clyne circumvent US immigration laws.

=== Guilty plea and sentencing ===
Under the original indictment, Mack faced a minimum of 15 years to life in prison if found guilty. In March 2019, it was revealed in court that Mack and the other defendants in the case were in "active plea negotiations" as Raniere appeared in court to plead not guilty to additional child pornography charges related to the case.

According to a filing by the United States Attorney for the Eastern District of New York, Mack sat down for proffer sessions to assist the government in the prosecution of Raniere starting in April 2019. Mack detailed the inner workings of DOS. "Mack also provided details regarding crimes committed by other first-line DOS masters, including assignments to seduce Raniere and efforts to find Raniere a virgin successor. Mack detailed Raniere's role in devising assignments for Mack's slaves, including, among other things, Raniere's repeated requests for nude photographs from Mack's DOS slaves; Raniere's instructions regarding the seduction assignment; and Raniere's encouragement of the use of demeaning and derogatory language, including racial slurs, to humiliate DOS slaves." Mack provided information to the government about Clare Bronfman's attempts to harass and threaten DOS victims. Mack also provided a recording in which Raniere detailed how he wanted the branding ceremony conducted.

On April 8, 2019, Mack pleaded guilty to racketeering and racketeering conspiracy and admitted to state law extortion and forced labor. In June 2019, Raniere was found guilty on all charges and was sentenced to 120 years in October 2020. The COVID-19 pandemic in the United States delayed court proceedings, including the sentencings of Mack and other NXIVM defendants. In 2021, prosecutors began the process of sentencing Mack. Under advisory sentencing guidelines, Mack faced 14 to 17.5 years in prison. The U.S. Attorney credited Mack with providing "detailed and highly corroborated information" and advocated for favorable sentencing for Mack.

Days before the sentencing, Mack released a statement in which she repudiated Raniere, saying that her involvement with NXIVM was "the biggest mistake and greatest regret of [her] life" and expressed remorse in regard to those affected. In addition to the letter, her attorneys asked for no jail time in consideration for Mack's remorse and her cooperation with Raniere's prosecution.

On June 30, 2021, Mack was sentenced to three years in prison and three years of probation, 1,000 hours of community service, and a fine of $20,000. On September 13, 2021, Mack reported to Federal Correctional Institution, Dublin, in Dublin, California to begin her prison sentence. She was released early on July 3, 2023, after serving 1 year, 9 months, and 20 days of a 3-year sentence.

=== Civil lawsuit ===
In January 2020, Mack, Raniere, Clyne, and other NXIVM individuals were named as defendants in a civil lawsuit filed in federal court by 80 former NXIVM members. The lawsuit details allegations of fraud and abuse and charges of being a pyramid scheme; as well as exploitation of its recruits, conducting illegal human experiments, and making it "physically and psychologically difficult, and in some cases impossible, to leave the coercive community."

=== Fictional portrayal ===
In 2019, Catherine Oxenberg produced the Lifetime television film Escaping the NXIVM Cult: A Mother's Fight to Save Her Daughter, with actress Sara Fletcher as Mack.

== Personal life ==
Mack had a long-term relationship with Canadian actor Chad Krowchuk during the 2000s when she was residing in Vancouver, British Columbia, where Smallville was produced.

In February 2017, Mack married Canadian actress Nicki Clyne, a fellow NXIVM member. The marriage was alleged to have been a sham to get Clyne around U.S. immigration laws. India Oxenberg, a witness at Mack and Clyne's wedding ceremony, later confirmed that the marriage was fake and orchestrated by Raniere to keep Clyne in the United States. In December 2020, Mack filed for divorce from Clyne. Mack and Clyne were both sexual partners with NXIVM founder Keith Raniere. In 2025, Mack married Frank Meeink.

It was reported in 2020 that Mack had attended classes at UC Berkeley. After her prison sentence, she was pursuing a master's degree in social work, after initially enrolling at UC Berkeley as a women's and gender studies major.

In 2025, Mack gave her first post-prison interview to Natalie Robehmed for seven episodes of CBC/Radio's podcast Uncover in season 35. Mack spoke of her childhood, how her relationship with Raniere developed, and about her time in prison. (Note: The podcast covered NXIVM in depth in its premiere season.)

== Filmography ==
Film
Year	Title	Role	Notes
1989	Police Academy 6: City Under Siege	Little Girl	
1993	Night Eyes 3	Natalie	
1994	Camp Nowhere	Heather	
1995	No Dessert, Dad, till You Mow the Lawn	Monica Cochran	
1997	Honey, We Shrunk Ourselves	Jenny Szalinski	
2006	The Ant Bully	Tiffany Nickle	Voice
2008	Alice & Huck	Alice	Short film
2009	You	Quincey	
2009	Superman/Batman: Public Enemies	Power Girl	Voice, direct-to-video
2010	Frog	Her	Short film
2010	Purgatory	Woman	Short film
2011	Marilyn	Marilyn	
2011	Blink	Producer	Short film

Television
Year	Title	Role	Notes
1989	I Know My First Name Is Steven	Nettie	Television film
1990	Shangri-La Plaza	Jenny	Episode: "Pilot"
1990	Empty Nest	Gloria	Episode: "There's No Accounting"
1991	Switched at Birth	Normia Twigg	Television film
1991	Living a Lie	Stella	Television film
1992	The Perfect Bride	Little Stephanie	Television film
1992	A Private Matter	Terri Finkbine	Television film
1992	A Message from Holly	Ida	Television film
1993	Evening Shade	Julia	2 episodes
1993	A Mother's Revenge	Wendy Sanders	Television film
1995	Dad, the Angel & Me	Andrea	Television film
1995	Sweet Justice	Jessica	Episode: "Broken Ties"
1996	Stolen Memories: Secrets from the Rose Garden	Katie	Television film
1996	The Care and Handling of Roses	Bess Townsend	Television film
1996	Unlikely Angel	Sarah Bartilson	Television film
1997	Hiller and Diller	Brooke	TV series
1998	7th Heaven	Nicole Jacob	Episode: "Cutters"
1999	Providence	Alicia	Episode: "Good Fellows"
2000	Opposite Sex	Kate Jacobs	8 episodes
2001	Kate Brasher	Georgia	Episode: "Georgia"
2001	My Horrible Year!	Nicola 'Nik' Faulkner	Television film
2001–2011	Smallville	Chloe Sullivan	Series regular, 204 episodes
2002	The Nightmare Room	Charlotte Scott	Episode: "Camp Nowhere"
2006	The Batman	Clea	Voice, episode: "The Everywhere Man"
2012, 2014	Wilfred	Amanda	Recurring role
2015	The Following	Hilary	Guest role
2015	American Odyssey	Julia	Guest role
2016	Lost in Oz	Evelyn	Voice (season 1)

Web series
Year	Title	Role	Notes
2003–2004	Smallville: Chloe Chronicles	Chloe Sullivan	8 episodes
2006	Smallville: Vengeance Chronicles	Chloe Sullivan	6 episodes
2010	Riese	Marlise	3 episodes
2010	Dirty Little Secret	Lauren Belle	Voice

Director
Year	Title	Episodes	Notes
2009–2010	Smallville	"Power"; "Warrior"	2 episodes

== Awards and nominations ==
Year	Award	Category	Work	Result
2002	Teen Choice Award	Best Sidekick in a TV Series	Smallville	Nominated
2003	Teen Choice Award	Best Sidekick in a TV Series	Smallville	Nominated
2004	Teen Choice Award	Best Sidekick in a TV Series	Smallville	Nominated
2005	Saturn Award	Best Supporting Actress on Television	Smallville	Nominated
2005	Teen Choice Award	Best Sidekick in a TV Series	Smallville	Nominated
2006	Teen Choice Award	Best Sidekick in a TV Series	Smallville	Won
2006	Saturn Award	Best Supporting Actress on Television	Smallville	Nominated
2007	Teen Choice Award	Best Sidekick in a TV Series	Smallville	Won
2008	SyFy Genre Award	Best Supporting Actress	Smallville	Won
2009	Teen Choice Award	Best Sidekick in a TV Series	Smallville	Nominated
