= Secret Girlfriend =

2009 American television sitcom

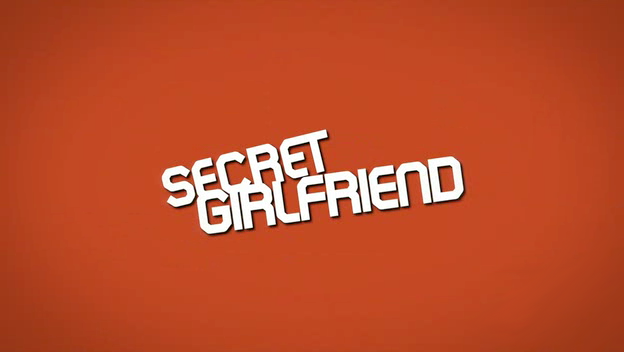
- Genre: Sitcom
- Created by: Jay Rondot; Ross Novie
- Directed by: Ross Novie
- Starring: Sara E. R. Fletcher; Alexis Krause; Michael Blaiklock; Derek Miller
- Composer: Stephen Robert Phillips
- Country of origin: United States
- Original language: English
- No. of seasons: 1
- No. of episodes: 6

Production
- Production locations: Los Angeles, California
- Running time: 22 minutes
- Production companies: FremantleMedia North America; Comedy Partners

Original release
- Network: Comedy Central
- Release: October 7 – November 11, 2009

Secret Girlfriend is an American television sitcom which was produced by FremantleMedia North America and aired on Comedy Central from October 7 to November 11, 2009. The show features the viewer as the "star" of a dating satire, with the show's actors addressing the camera as if it were the lead character.

Secret Girlfriend originated as a web series created by Jay Rondot and Ross Novie, who are executive producers on the TV adaptation. The showrunner was Ben Wexler, also an executive producer. The series was recast for television. Each half-hour episode includes two eleven-minute segments.

On April 29, 2010, though no media websites officially announced the show's cancellation, Novie announced via Twitter that there would be no second season.

== Cast ==
=== Main ===
- Derek Miller as Phil – Phil is one of the best friends and roommates of the main character, "You". He and Sam make internet videos for a living. He, too, is a ladies' man, but not as successful as You are. Whenever he and Sam get into arguments, You tend to favor his side. He goes to extreme lengths to pick up girls, including buying a dog and getting a phone number that is one digit off of that of a crisis hotline. He strongly dislikes Mandy and encourages You to date Jessica instead.
- Michael Blaiklock as Sam – Sam is the other best friend and roommate of the main character, "You". He is overweight and was once mistaken for a woman at a lesbian bar because of his "man boobs". He is typically less successful with the ladies than either You or Phil are. He often goes out drinking with his roommates in an attempt to pick up women. He makes internet videos for a living alongside Phil. He always says hi to Mandy and supports Your relationship with Jessica. It is hinted in his first "wet dream" that he likes Mandy.
- Alexis Krause as Mandy, MandyCat – Mandy is the main character's, or "Your", rich yet emotionally unstable ex-girlfriend. She seems to be bipolar due to her constantly shifting moods and opinions toward You and her feelings about getting back together with You. Although You broke up with her three months earlier, You still have sex with her and she often follows you around to find out what You are doing with other girls. She is extremely jealous, and you fear what she will do if she finds out about Jessica, so you try to keep the two apart. However, due to her stalker-like tendencies, she finds out and the two get in a cat-fight. We learn in the Season 1 finale 2 part episode Mandy has a sister named Heather and her step-mom used to be her dad's maid.
- Sara E. R. Fletcher as Jessica Johnson – The main character, You, met Jessica in a liquor store and she asks for your number. Although she has had a boyfriend for the past two years named Chad, she often goes out with You and admits to having feelings for You. She gets along with your roommates, Phil and Sam, and the four of you often get into various schemes together. You try to keep her from Mandy, your crazy ex-girlfriend, as you fear for Jessica's safety, but the two eventually meet. Once Jessica breaks up with her boyfriend, she attempts to have sex with You, but is constantly interrupted and has to go out of town to a family reunion. When she gets back, the two of you get together and have a night of sex, thus beginning your relationship with her. She begins acting clingy, leading Phil to be concerned about the state of your relationship. When Mandy finally confronts her about taking you back she and Jessica get into a fight.

=== Recurring ===
- Taylor Cole as Martina, Hot Neighbor – a neighbor of Phil and Sam.
- Italia Ricci as Sasha – Jessica's friend, who is a lesbian.
- Tonya Kay as Cassidy – Sasha's girlfriend.
- Dawan Owens as Chester – neighbor of You, Phil, and Sam. Appears in two episodes in Season 1.

== Reception ==
The show has received mostly negative reviews. It received a 49/100 on Metacritic. Matthew Gilbert of The Boston Globe wrote, "The script is built on viral-video-sized gags wrapped in teen-boy fantasies about strip clubs and dangerous women with big breasts. It's like Entourage without glamor, heart, or Ari, and it's like It's Always Sunny in Philadelphia without the twisted wit."

James Poniewozik of Time called Secret Girlfriend a "fascinatingly bad comedy," saying it was doomed not from being a "guy-oriented sex comedy" but from its second-person format: "[The format] sucks the life out of the characters. We're supposed to believe that You, the protagonist, are awesome, cool, funny, apparently irresistible. Why? You never say anything clever or charming. You never say anything...It makes all the interactions implausible (unless the viewer is an egomaniac)."

The A.V. Club's Steve Heisler gave the show an F and wrote, "Secret Girlfriend is hardly a comedy show; hardly a 'show' for that matter. There's little-to-no plot, and jokes about characters are always sacrificed for jokes about dongs." Brian Lowry of Variety wrote, "Expanding their web product, Jay Rondot and Ross Novie approach their task with all the finesse of a beer commercial, but it's periodically effective — and a bit like virtual porn." He called the show "fitfully funny."

Premium Hollywood gave the show a positive review for its fast pace and uniqueness.

== Episodes ==
No.	Title	Directed by	Written by	Original release date
1.1	"You And Your Ex Call It Quits"	Ross Novie	Teleplay by : Ross Novie & Jay Rondot & Harris Wittels; Story by : Ross Novie & Jay Rondot	October 7, 2009
The episode begins with Mandy finally breaking up with you. She says she is going out with a DJ and will never come back to you, then she has break-up sex with you. Later Sam and Phil try to cheer you up. Phil tries to grieve over losing your crazy ex. Sam, wants to go out a get you laid with another girl as soon as possible. You agree and go out looking for a good time. Along the way you pull up to a car full of ladies and Sam invites them back to the apartment where you all live. One of the girls, Brianna tries to get you in the pool with her, but there is no more alcohol left. You "volunteer" to run for more beer. At one store you find and stare at Jessica. You exchange each other's numbers and you hurry back. But the girls have already bailed. You and your roommates then hold an audition for a new web video with a half naked girl. Through some unwanted words from Phil and a confirmation of no payment from Sam, all the models walk out disgusted. You have your first date with Jessica by ordering Pizza and playing video games. She wants to invite you to her place but she's not ready for that yet.
1.2	"You Find an Awesome Strip Club"	Ross Novie	Ross Novie	October 7, 2009
Mandy takes you shopping for bras, and ends up dragging You into a changing room to give You a blow job. You and Mandy return to Your apartment to find Phil filming Sam dressed as a baby in front of a green screen, with green tape placed over his mouth so that he can substitute dialogue in later. Then You, Phil and Sam go to a local strip club, where Phil and Sam marvel at how delicious the food is. Jessica sends You a message inviting You to a game of kickball, to which You agree to come on the condition that she waits thirty minutes, as a dancer at the strip club has just offered You a private dance. At the kickball game, You first take part in a keg stand, and then play on the team opposing Jessica's. Upon kicking the ball, you almost make it to home plate before Jessica pegs your eye out. As she apologizes for hitting You in the face, and asks what she can do to make it up to You, the scene cuts to You having sex with Mandy. You obviously aren't paying any attention to her. Meanwhile Phil and Sam have decided to produce a commercial for the strip club, and ask You to get it from the apartment and bring it to the strip club. At the apartment, You take the time to stare at your Hot Neighbor practicing yoga stretches, before grabbing the DVD and taking it to the strip club. The commercial Phil and Sam produced turns out to focus more on the club's food than its dancers, and the owner dismisses all three of you with disgust. Mandy, deciding You have been unfaithful to her, tries to make you jealous by going up onto the stage and dancing in a stripper outfit. Phil tries to steal some of the club's food, only to be tackled to the ground, while Sam commandeers the DJ's box. Mandy also gets into a fight with the other stripper on stage. All of you are thrown out, while Mandy announces that You and her are back together because she "saw the way You were looking at her". A few days later, You, Sam and Phil send Jessica into the club to get food, and she races into the car announcing that the food there is great. Sam declares his approval of Jessica, and all four of you race off.
2.1	"You Learn to Appreciate Life"	Ross Novie	Ross Novie & Jay Rondot	October 14, 2009
2.2	"You Help Sam Have His First Wet Dream"	Ross Novie	Greg Lisbe & David Gross	October 14, 2009
Sam and Phil post up a sign making the apartment pool a nude beach. So far the only one to get naked is for neighbor Chester. Later that night when everyone's gone Hot Neighbor notices the sign and strips in front of you. Sam and Phil sleep, while Hot Neighbor invites you in. You unzip your pants and appear to make out with her. Next day Phil tells about his wet dream about Hot Neighbor (revealed to be named Martina), Which strangely sounds like the sex you had with her. Sam explains he never had a wet dream and plans to stop masturbating in hopes that this will help him. Bad part is he removes all porno from your house (including Ikea Catalogs). Just then Chester pops in and challenges you to a game of paintball. Then Jess invites you to a party with Phil and Sam. Sam is afraid some girl will "jerk him off". Then Mandy shows up asking you to upload her audition video for the real world. You all go to the party, despite Sam's repulsion of women. You learn the "Jerry Mcguire"s Johnathan Lipnicki was invited. Phil remembers a back in high school when Lipniki stole his dream girl. Mandy tracks you down and tries to make you jealous with Lipniki. After you find Jessica you and Phil explain why Mandy mustn't know about you and her. Later Sam gets drunk and falls asleep on a bed where all the coats are kept. Jessica decides to leave to meet up with her boyfriend. After the party Everyone watches Sam have his first wet dream.(in the dream he is doing it with Mandy!) Later Phil edits Mandy's audition tape with pics of Sam's wet dream and you and him decide to send that off.
3.1	"You Hang with Some Lesbians"	Ross Novie	Kate Purdy	October 21, 2009
Jessica invites Phil, you, and Sam to go watch her roommate Sasha's girlfriends show. After running to the liquor store, where Sam Mixes Scope mouthwash and Scotch AKA Scotche, you meet up with Jess and her roommate Sasha. Phil already tries to hook up with her by telling her things about his dick. Then you see Cassidy: Sasha's girl and her show scares everyone with what happens if you mess with her girl. You then go to hang at a lesbian bar and Sam gets it on with a lesbian who thinks he's a woman. You get your first dance with Jessica and Phil dances with Sasha, with Cassidy watching carefully. Later it is revealed that Sam is not a girl, and that Phil showed Sasha his dick. Cassidy knocks out Phil and Sam is dog-piled by lesbians. You try to leave but then Cassidy grabs you saying, "Where are you going pretty boy?" and knocks you to ground too. Somehow the barfight was resolved with Jessica's and your friends hating each other and arguing on drive back to Phil's car. You all drive home and say good night to Jessica. Later Sam farts in the car and you and Phil smell mints.
3.2	"Your Ex Tries to Make You Jealous"	Ross Novie	Kirill Baru & Eric Zimmerman	October 21, 2009
You are out with Mandy for dinner. Most likely against your will because you stare at every other girl in the place. Mandy decides to try to make you jealous by flashing her boobs at the male waiter. You later learn that phil's new cell phone is one digit from a crisis hotline. He's been using it to hook up with girls. Mandy begins hanging out with Sam attempting to make you jealous and take her back, much to sam's dismay. Phil continues using his new number to hook up with women by "talking them off cliffs". Mandy eventually makes Sam go with her to a protest. She even makes Sam proclaim this to you and Phil. Jessica invites you to play with her at a hotel pool. After sneaking in, you and her nearly embrace. But she stops and admits she's not ready to move on from her boyfriend. You find out that Sam was tazered by police when the protest turned to a riot. Phil shows you the sex tape that Mandy made with Sam. (all of it obviously fake, but funny as hell).
4.1	"You Solve a Porn-Related Mystery"	Ross Novie	Jay Rondot	October 28, 2009
After a bit of 'back yard wrasslin", and a failed attempt to woo Hot Neighbor you and your friends hit the Gym. You and Sam spot a hot girl named Erin. Turns out that she is a porn star. You try to see her in one of her movies but the name she gave you is no good. You break out Sam's organized stash of Porn, and try to find this girls porn name. You get several texts from Jessica, who's out of town with her boyfriend in wine tasting country. Hot neighbor tries to have beers with you but sees all the porn mystery material and backs out. You finally decide to go undercover and ask Erin out. After a long dinner, she takes you to her place. You try to get clues but get surprised by Erin's roommate and Erin in her underwear. Both of them look seductively at you and decide to have a threesome. But in all the excitement you never get her name. Sam and Phil are furious until you explain the story. Sam deduces that Erin's porn name is Peaches Glenbrook. With the mystery solved you have celebration lunch with the guys. Jess returns wondering what you've been up to. And Sam blurts out your threesome.
4.2	"You Try to Make Some Internet Cash"	Ross Novie	Kate Purdy	October 28, 2009
5.1	"You Get An Aquarium Girl"	Ross Novie	David Gross & Greg Lisbe	November 4, 2009
You, Sam, and Phil are out clubbing and are just about to leave. Then Sam spots the Aquarium girl, a hot woman that just sits behind glass reading magazines. Sam is instantly attracted and his desire for her, and smoking weed in her glass place gets her fired. You all decide to hire her to sit on the couch in your apartment for a live web cam broadcast. Sam gets attached to her and misses Jessica's birthday party. Here you meet Jessica's boyfriend Chad and are bummed out. But he does invite you guys out to a derby. Meanwhile Sam has not only lets the aquarium girl smoke all Phil's weed but she also eats all of Phil's meatballs. You force Sam to You find out later that Chad is only playing mister nice guy with Jessica. You seek advice from Phil. Later while Phil is out meeting his drug dealer the Aquarium girl sends Sam out for fish tacos. All the time she just wanted to get you alone for sex. You join her in the shower and have wet sex, before Mandy shows up and scolds you for it. After Sam tells everyone where Aquarium girl is, your place is packed with horney guys. Phil and you agree to take her back to the club, much to Sam's dismay. Then Phil and Sam see you two having sex on a hidden web cam in the bathroom. Sam hates you for it. Phil smiles at you for it.
5.2	"Your Buddies Get into a Fight"	Ross Novie	Adam F. Goldberg & Chris Bishop	November 4, 2009
After their latest video to secretly film women on the beach ends up with them dressed as pirates, Sam and Phil have a huge argument over whose fault it was and end up fighting. Phils attempts to smooth things over with beer do no good as Sam declares they are no longer friends, resulting in each of them trying to embarrass the other at every opportunity, which only succeeds in embarrassing You. Jessica invites You to a work lunch to talk, but Sam and Phil tag along and start arguing again. Jessica pulls You aside and reveals she and Chad have broke up, but she is leaving town for a week. Rather than wait until she gets back, you two leave to have sex at her house, only to find Sasha has invited 30 lesbians to party, and end up partying until Jessica ends up passed out, so Sasha and You put her to bed. Sam later discovers that Phil has invited his neighbor Eddie to be his new best friend as 'New Sam', so Sam gets a group of new friends in return. Jessica then invites You to a hotel with instructions to bring whipped cream, and after throwing out the hotel porter, you are interrupted by a fire alarm. Jessica, in sheer frustration, decides to go old school and do it in the back seat of her car, only to knock the parking brake off and have a crash, and she has to leave to catch her flight. When Sam tries to stop Phil from ruining his Fondue party, Jessica invites You for a quickie at the airport due to a delayed flight, but Phil calls You back before You get there because he has learned Sams new friends are Evangelists, only to discover he already knows and is rolling with it to score free food and nail one of them, restoring their friendship.
6.1	"You Have to Choose Between Two Girls"	Ross Novie	Ben Wexler	November 11, 2009
Jessica is at a family vacation in Hawaii so Phil, Sam and You go to a party to pick up chicks. While there you get girls for Sam and Phil. When you arrive back home Mandy is in your room and apologizes for being a bitch and finally recognizes that you broke up. The next morning she invites all of you to her father's birthday party, that night. The hand model Phil took home last night has hurt his penis because of a failed hand-job. It is also revealed that Hot Girls make Sam ejaculate prematurely. At the party, Mandy's sister hits on Phil to piss off her dad.You sneak off and while talking to a waitress who was staring at you the whole time. But Mandy drives her off. When Mandy's sister tries to touch his penis he yells and pushed her onto Sam who then ejaculates all over himself. Mandy finds you and tries to get you to come with her. By this time Jessica is back from the airport so instead you ditch Mandy and go over to Jessica's where you finally have sex. Mandy calls the next morning threatening Jess and you. Then Jess offers you "Pancakes to eat".
6.2	"You Get a New Girlfriend"	Ross Novie	Adam F. Goldberg & Chris Bishop	November 11, 2009
After having sex, You and Jessica start dating. Mandy finds out and starts following Jessica. She comes over to your apartment and starts taking it over. Phil is concerned that she is taking it too fast with you. On the way to a party for Phil's sister, "Hot Neighbor" reveals she has a crush on you. Sam is boasting about the possibility that he's going to bed Phil's sister Cloie. After you and the guys arrive, an Asian girl who knows Sam from his "human teabag" video, begins openly flirting with him, to whom he rejects as he is still focused on Phil's sister. When Sam finally meets Cloie, she's immediately disenchanted by him and rejects his advances. Mandy arrives at the party wanting to kill Jessica because you two are now dating. You and Jessica both hide in the garage and have almost fully clothed sex. You and Jessica are then interrupted by Sam and the Asian girl pursuing him, where she proceeds to non-statutorily rape him. You attempt to intervene, but Sam wants you to go away as being raped by a hot girl is one of his biggest fantasies. Mandy confronts Jessica, upon where they start fighting and fall into the pool. As this is happening "Hot Neighbor" comes over and asks if you want to leave with her then you are left with a choice. The screen then blacks out with an apparent cliffhanger. Ending the series.
