= Don't Trust the B— in Apartment 23 =

American television sitcom (2012–2014)

- Also known as: Don't Trust the Bitch in Apartment 23; Don't Trust the B; Apartment 23
- Genre: Sitcom
- Created by: Nahnatchka Khan
- Starring: Krysten Ritter; Dreama Walker; Liza Lapira; Michael Blaiklock; Eric André; James Van Der Beek; Ray Ford
- Narrated by: Dreama Walker
- Theme music composer: John Adair; Steve Hampton
- Opening theme: "Don't Trust the B— in Apartment 23" theme by Katie Hampton
- Composers: Craig Wedren; Daniel Licht (ep. 1); Michael Cassidy (ep. 1); Erica Weis (ep. 1–2); Orr Rebhun (ep. 2)
- Country of origin: United States
- Original language: English
- No. of seasons: 2
- No. of episodes: 26

Production
- Executive producers: Jeff Morton; David Hemingson; Nahnatchka Khan; Justin McEwen; Jason Winer; David Windsor
- Producers: Justin McEwen; Marshall Boone; Barbara Black; Chris Smirnoff; Sally Young; Daniel Hank
- Production location: New York City
- Cinematography: Brandon Mastrippolito; Joe Pennella; James R. Bagdonas
- Editors: Stuart Bass; Jamie Gross; Josh Schaeffer; Ryan Case; Preston Rapp
- Camera setup: Single-camera
- Running time: 22 minutes
- Production companies: Fierce Baby Productions; Hemingson Entertainment; 20th Century Fox Television

Original release
- Network: ABC
- Release: April 11, 2012 – September 6, 2014

Don't Trust the B— in Apartment 23 is an American television sitcom created by Nahnatchka Khan. It was broadcast on ABC between April 11, 2012, and September 6, 2014, comprising two seasons and 26 episodes. Originally a mid-season replacement, the network renewed the series for a second season in May 2012; six episodes from the first season were aired as part of the second without regard for continuity.

In the story, Krysten Ritter stars as Chloe, an irresponsible party girl who searches for roommates by asking for rent up front and then behaving outrageously until they leave. Her latest roommate June Colburn (Dreama Walker) proves to be harder to drive away, and the women end up forming an unlikely friendship. The supporting cast includes James Van Der Beek, who portrays a fictionalized version of himself and a friend of Chloe's.

== Plot ==
The series follows June Colburn as she moves from Indiana to New York City to pursue her dream job until she finds out that it no longer exists. She ends up moving in with a bon vivant party girl named Chloe. Chloe keeps her apartment by inviting roommates to move in, asking for rent up front, and then behaving outrageously until they leave. June proves more difficult to dislodge than expected, and when June repels Chloe's attempt to eject her, the two women form an unlikely friendship.

== Cast and characters ==
=== Main ===
- Krysten Ritter as Chloe, the titular "Bitch in Apartment 23", a hard-partying, irresponsible, freeloading, sexually adventurous con artist, described as having "the morals of a pirate".
- Dreama Walker as June Colburn, a naïve and friendly girl from Richmond, Indiana who becomes Chloe's roommate after moving to New York and losing both her job and apartment when the investment firm that hired her goes bankrupt on her first day.
- Liza Lapira (Note: Six episodes were held from the first season and aired as part of the second season. As consequence, Lapira was credited in the main cast in six of the second season's episodes, while Ford was credited as a guest star, despite him having been promoted to the main cast.) as Robin (season 1; guest season 2), a nurse and one of Chloe's former roommates, who is obsessed with her.
- Michael Blaiklock as Eli Webber, a perverted but friendly city health inspector and next-door neighbor of Chloe and June's who occasionally spies on the girls.
- Eric André as Mark Reynolds, the meek manager of a coffee shop who hires June, whom he met at her failed job, to work for him.
- James Van Der Beek as a fictionalized version of himself, a close friend of Chloe's who is desperate to revitalize his dwindling acting career.
- Ray Ford as Luther Wilson (season 2; recurring season 1), James' devoted personal assistant.

=== Recurring ===
- Tate Ellington as Steven, June's ex-fiancé
- Eve Gordon as Connie Colburn, June's mother, whom June, then James, occasionally turns to for advice
- Peter MacKenzie as Donald Colburn, June's father
- Katherine Tokarz as Nicole, a nurse with whom Steven cheats on June
- Jennie Pierson as Pepper, June and Mark's socially awkward coworker at the coffee shop
- Rosalind Chao as Pastor Jin, the pastor at the First Korean Baptist Church where June attends worship services
- Angelique Cabral as Fox Paris, June's rival at Harkin Financial
- Teresa Huang as Hillary, June's coworker at Harkin Financial

=== Guest ===
- Michael Landes as Scott, Chloe's father, who has a brief relationship with June
- Marin Hinkle as Karen, Chloe's paraplegic mother
- Kerris Dorsey as Molly, Chloe's temporary foster daughter
- Nora Kirkpatrick as Crissy, June's friend
- Hartley Sawyer as Charles, who has a brief sexual relationship with June
- Shanti Lowry as Valentina, James's upgraded Dancing with the Stars partner
- David Krumholtz as Patrick Kelly, the creator of the graphic novel Shitagi Nashi (Tall Slut, No Panties), based on Chloe
- Ben Lawson as Benjamin Lovett, an Australian director, who is friends with James and becomes a love interest for Chloe
- Keith Allan as Peter, an employee at People magazine
- Missi Pyle as Angie Beckencort, a lousy pro dancer who ends up paired with James on Dancing with the Stars
- Fiona Gubelmann as Stephanie, one of June's friends from Pilates
- Kyle Howard as Daniel, who briefly dates June
- Patti Deutsch as an old lady
- Michael Stahl-David as Teddy, Chloe's childhood friend from psychopath camp
- Nicholas D'Agosto as Will, James's agent's assistant who briefly dates June
- Jonathan Willie Cruz (Note: Incorrectly credited on-screen as Jonathan William Cruz) as James Martinez, June's and Luther's yoga instructor
- Meg Chambers Steedle as Emily, who briefly dates James
- Sarah Wright Olsen as Trish, Chloe's first New York roommate
- Meagen Fay as Katherine, James's mother
- Nicky Endres as Hansel, a "Korean gay hipster" whose catch phrase "Arigato, Hey!" is used in multiple episodes.

=== Special cameos ===
- Kiernan Shipka, James's co-star in a poorly conceived father/daughter body-swap film
- Kevin Sorbo, Chloe's unwitting wedding date
- Dean Cain, James's Dancing with the Stars rival
- Busy Philipps, James's former Dawson's Creek co-star
- Frankie Muniz, a hapless shopper
- Mark-Paul Gosselaar, who gives James a pep-talk about fleeting fame
- Karina Smirnoff, Dean Cain's Dancing with the Stars partner
- Charo, Chloe's muse
- Richard Dean Anderson, one of the potential candidates to be James's biological father

== Episodes ==
=== Series overview ===
Season	Episodes	Originally released	
Season	Episodes	First released	Last released
1	7	April 11, 2012	May 23, 2012
2	19	October 23, 2012	September 6, 2014

=== Season 1 (2012) ===
No. overall	No. in season	Title	Directed by	Written by	Original release date	Prod. code	US viewers (millions)
1	1	"Pilot"	Jason Winer	Nahnatchka Khan	April 11, 2012	1ATF79	6.91
June lands her dream job at a mortgage company and an apartment in Manhattan, while her fiancé, Steven, finishes up his master's degree in Indiana. However, on her first day of work, the company is shut down after the CEO is arrested for embezzlement, causing June to lose both her job and her apartment. She then meets and is instantly taken with a potential roommate, Chloe. June decides that she wants to move in, but Chloe soon reveals her true intentions as she plots to scam June out of her rent money. June retaliates by selling all of Chloe's possessions. When Steven arrives for June's birthday, Chloe learns he is cheating on June with multiple women. She tries to alert June, who refuses to believe her. After being caught having sex with Steven on June's birthday cake, Chloe explains to June that she only did it to prove he was a cheater as June was not going to believe her unless June walked in on the worst possible scenario. Although sad, June is grateful that Chloe helped her discover the truth about Steven, saving her from wasting the best years of her life, and the two form an unusual friendship.
2	2	"Daddy's Girl..."	Michael Spiller	Nahnatchka Khan	April 18, 2012	1ATF01	6.43
Following June's breakup with Steven, Chloe sets her up with a man she believes is perfect for her, Scott. The two hit it off until June discovers that Scott is Chloe's father, whom she claims is separated from her mother. To make matters worse, Chloe's mother stops by in distress suspecting that her husband is cheating on her. Meanwhile, James teaches an acting class at New York University, but he is unable to get his students interested in anything other than his Dawson's Creek days.
3	3	"Parent Trap..."	Chris Koch	Sally Bradford McKenna	April 25, 2012	1ATF09	4.91
When June—who is juggling an unpaid internship with her job at the coffee shop—accuses Chloe of being selfish and irresponsible, Chloe adopts a foster daughter and hires her as her personal assistant. James lands a role in a film opposite Mad Men child star Kiernan Shipka.
4	4	"The Wedding..."	Chris Koch	Casey Johnson and David Windsor	May 2, 2012	1ATF04	5.73
June is depressed when she receives a wedding invitation addressed to her and her ex-fiancé, Steven. Chloe decides to take June around the city and teach her how to be confident. However, Chloe becomes jealous over the budding friendship between June and James.
5	5	"Making Rent..."	Michael Spiller	Corey Nickerson	May 9, 2012	1ATF03	5.69
After June catches Chloe pulling her roommate scam again, both women attempt to find alternative ways of making the rent. James launches a new line of super-skinny jeans named Beek Jeans.
6	6	"It's Just Sex..."	Nanette Burstein	Billy Finnegan	May 16, 2012	1ATF07	4.73
Chloe encourages June to have casual sex with the coffee-shop customer she is attracted to. However, once the man becomes emotionally attached to June, Chloe insists that she break up with him. James panics when a copy of an old sex tape of him and Chloe falls into the hands of a porn distributor.
7	7	"Shitagi Nashi..."	Wendey Stanzler	Casey Johnson and David Windsor	May 23, 2012	1ATF10	5.60
June struggles to keep up with Chloe's fast-paced lifestyle, ending up in the hospital with alcohol poisoning. She also discovers that Chloe is the subject of a graphic novel called Tall Slut, No Panties, which is popular in Japan. James is upset when he learns that Dean Cain has a bigger dressing room when both compete on Dancing with the Stars.

=== Season 2 (2012–14) ===
No. overall	No. in season	Title	Directed by	Written by	Original release date	Prod. code	US viewers (millions)
8	1	"A Reunion..."	Wendey Stanzler	Nahnatchka Khan	October 23, 2012	2ATF01	4.20
When James receives a letter from cast members of Dawson's Creek urging him to participate in a reunion episode to mark the 10th anniversary of the series finale, June sets out to make the reunion episode happen. However, Chloe reveals to June that she is the one who has been sending him fake letters every year. After Chloe confesses everything to James, he decides to move forward with the reunion and calls his former castmates, only to learn that they all hate him because of something he did when the show ended. Busy Philipps, Frankie Muniz, and Mark-Paul Gosselaar guest star as fictionalized versions of themselves.
9	2	"Love and Monsters..."	Victor Nelli Jr.	Sally Bradford McKenna	October 30, 2012	2ATF03	3.25
James, who is terrified of Halloween, throws his annual "positivity party" on Halloween. June discovers that Chloe is dating a man named Benjamin and is happy to see her friend in a real relationship until she learns that he is the latest victim of Chloe's annual Halloween prank, wherein she makes a person's deepest fears come true. Chloe plans to make Benjamin think of her as his mother, who left when he was seven, before breaking up with him. Benjamin reveals that he got wind of her prank through James, and has been pulling the same trick on her by having her live her life as if it were a chick flick.
10	3	"Sexy People..."	Lev L. Spiro	Corey Nickerson	November 13, 2012	2ATF04	3.10
June awaits the announcement of People magazine's "Sexiest Man Alive" list. When she says that James is not sexy enough to make the cut, Chloe accuses June of herd mentality, saying she will admire whoever makes the cover. To prove her point, Chloe takes over People's office by pretending to be the new managing editor and puts James on the cover, prompting June to see him in a new light.
11	4	"It's a Miracle..."	Rebecca Asher	Casey Johnson and David Windsor	November 20, 2012	2ATF02	2.99
Chloe and June have different thoughts about Thanksgiving. Since June cannot afford to fly home for Thanksgiving, Chloe persuades her to come to her parents' house for Thanksgiving, but June begins to feel uncomfortable. Meanwhile, James volunteers at an exclusive celebrity soup kitchen in order to attract publicity, but he is unpleasantly surprised when he and Luther get roped into actually working.
12	5	"Whatever It Takes..."	Henry Chan	David Hemingson	December 4, 2012	1ATF06	2.98
Chloe teaches June how to network by going drinking in the financial district, but when Chloe lands herself an attractive young broker whose father is a Wall Street mogul, she also lands June a dream job offer, although there are strings attached and June must make a tough decision. Meanwhile, James is worried when he is paired with the worst pro dancer for Dancing with the Stars.
13	6	"Bar Lies..."	Aundre Johnson	Laura McCreary	December 11, 2012	1ATF11	2.49
James and Luther travel to Los Angeles for the season premiere for Dancing with the Stars. Chloe takes advantage of James's empty penthouse for one of her money-making scams.
14	7	"A Weekend in the Hamptons..."	David Hemingson	Billy Finnegan	December 18, 2012	1ATF12	2.53
Since June is anxiously awaiting news on a potential job interview and James is still upset over his Dancing with the Stars fiasco, Chloe decides to take everyone along on a weekend getaway to the Hamptons, where she plans to gatecrash the party of the year and hook up with its elusive host.
15	8	"Paris..."	Jeffrey Walker	Laura McCreary	January 6, 2013	2ATF05	2.21
June is nervous and excited about starting her new job at Harkin Financial. She befriends a seemingly nice coworker, Fox Paris, but Chloe warns June that she might be a backstabber. Chloe's suspicions soon prove true, and though she initially offers to help June take down Fox, Chloe and Fox end up becoming friends, much to June's dismay. Meanwhile, Mark goes to James for advice on his newfound feelings for June.
16	9	"The Scarlet Neighbor..."	Wendey Stanzler	Laura McCreary	January 8, 2013	1ATF05	3.11
Chloe and June attend their first tenants' meeting after a new family moves into the building, but Chloe ends up making a scene and sparking outrage among the other residents. June becomes determined to restore Chloe's reputation, encouraging her to start dating appropriate men. However, things backfire when Chloe sets her sights on Mark, which is then further complicated by James's attempt to sabotage June's virtuous efforts.
17	10	"Mean Girls..."	Chris Koch	Sally Bradford McKenna	January 13, 2013	1ATF02	1.76
When Chloe resists June's efforts to bond with her, June befriends a group of women from her Pilates class who are the epitome of what Chloe detests. Meanwhile, James signs up to mentor an underprivileged child in order to beef up his public image.
18	11	"Dating Games..."	Gail Mancuso	Erik Durbin	January 15, 2013	2ATF08	2.73
June and Mark are obsessed with a reality dating show, and Chloe encourages June to go out and get an actual date. However, when Chloe and June both end up asking out the same man, Daniel, they get sucked into their very own dating game, with James orchestrating various challenges as the girls compete for Daniel's affections.
19	12	"The Leak..."	Michael Spiller	Tina Kil	March 25, 2013 (AUS); July 19, 2014 (U.S.)	1ATF08	N/A
James focuses all his attention on training for his upcoming appearance on Dancing with the Stars. When Luther is tasked with keeping James on a strict regimen, a jealous Chloe attempts to sabotage their efforts as she believes James should not overwork himself. To make matters worse, an embarrassing photo of James leaks all over the Internet.
20	13	"Monday June..."	Fred Goss	David Hemingson	April 1, 2013 (AUS); July 26, 2014 (U.S.)	2ATF07	N/A
June has been so overwhelmed with work that she has no time for anything else, including Chloe. In order to solve this, Chloe decides to slip June an herbal relaxant, causing June to black out for two days. As she tries to piece together what happened, June discovers some surprising things about herself. Meanwhile, James grapples with the idea that he may have impregnated June's friend, Crissy, on her wedding day.
21	14	"Teddy Trouble..."	Gail Mancuso	Billy Finnegan	April 8, 2013 (AUS); August 2, 2014 (U.S.)	2ATF06	N/A
Chloe and June receive a surprise visit from Teddy, Chloe's childhood friend from psychopath camp, who visits her every year when he goes off his medications. With the help of her mentally unstable friend, Chloe plans to fight off a group of vicious, out-of-town women in order to pick up a bargain at a department store's annual warehouse sale. However, Chloe finds herself increasingly distracted by the return of Benjamin, whom June insists is Chloe's true love. Meanwhile, James is devastated when he learns that his Beek Jeans were overstocked and ended up relegated to the chill-out corner at the sale where no one is buying them.
22	15	"The D..." "Making the Grade..."	Jeffrey Walker	Jeff Chiang and Eric Ziobrowski	April 15, 2013 (AUS); August 9, 2014 (U.S.)	2ATF09	N/A
June receives her one-year roommate evaluation from Chloe, in which she is shocked to learn that she has been given a D. After June presumes her low grade may have resulted from her poor dating record, Luther sets her up with James's agent's assistant, Will. The two hit it off, but their dates are constantly interrupted by phone calls from one of Will's clients, a demanding novelist who treats him like an errand boy. Meanwhile, James struggles with his audition for a new Woody Allen film.
23	16	"The Seven Year Bitch..."	Stuart Bass	Tina Kil	April 22, 2013 (AUS); August 16, 2014 (U.S.)	2ATF10	N/A
James invites Chloe and June out to dinner to meet the woman he has been dating, Emily. Chloe decides to use her veto power over Emily, forcing James to break up with her. However, she later discovers that James has been secretly continuing to date Emily, prompting Chloe to take a break from their seven-year friendship. June and Luther realize that they must reunite Chloe and James after their time apart leads to disastrous consequences.
24	17	"Using People..."	Michael McDonald	Sally Bradford McKenna	April 29, 2013 (AUS); August 23, 2014 (U.S.)	2ATF11	N/A
June is shocked to discover that Chloe has been attending Alcoholics Anonymous meetings in order to share her wild partying stories while stealing liquor from the recovering addicts. Pepper sets Mark up on a date with one of her friends, and June struggles to hide her jealousy. Chloe accuses June of using Mark by having him do favors while knowing he likes her. After Mark admits to June that he has feelings for her, they decide to have sex, but it turns out to be awful. Meanwhile, James learns that he is on the short list for a Martin Scorsese film, though Scorsese does not consider him deep enough for the role.
25	18	"Ocupado..."	David Hemingson	Casey Johnson and David Windsor	May 6, 2013 (AUS); August 30, 2014 (U.S.)	2ATF12	N/A
Chloe is excited about spending time with Benjamin, who is going to be in town to direct James in a sunglasses commercial. Chloe and Benjamin bond over the fact that they are both dating other people, though Chloe later becomes uncharacteristically jealous when she discovers that she is not the number-one woman in Benjamin's dating cycle.
26	19	"Original Bitch..."	Nahnatchka Khan	Corey Nickerson	May 13, 2013 (AUS); September 6, 2014 (U.S.)	2ATF13	N/A
Chloe hires a private investigator to track down her first New York roommate, Trish, on whom Chloe has been seeking revenge since she stole her dream of becoming a dancer on a popular dance television show years earlier. Upon discovering that Trish has died, Chloe's unfulfilled plans of vengeance begin to haunt her dreams. In a dream sequence, Chloe must complete challenges in order to reach her goal and overthrow Trish as the top dancer on the show while also realizing that she needs to trust June as her friend. Meanwhile, James learns that his father is not his biological father.

== Production and release ==
The show's former title card, when it was titled Apartment 23

By January 2009, the project was being developed for Fox with the interim title You Can't Trust the Bitch in Apartment 23, but was not selected to the 2009 fall contender. A year later, ABC greenlit the production of a pilot episode. In May 2011, the network picked up the project to series under the shortened title Apartment 23. The same month, ABC confirmed the series would premiere as a mid-season replacement in the 2011–12 fall season. In October, ABC changed back the series name, this time to a partially censored version, obscuring the last four letters of "Bitch" and rendering it as "B—". Ahead of its television premiere, the series' first two episodes were released in the United States on iTunes, Hulu, Xfinity, and ABC's website, and in Canada on Rogers on Demand and Citytv's website.

On May 11, 2012, ABC renewed the series for a second season. On May 23, the first season ended its broadcast run; seven episodes were aired, although the initial order consisted of 13 episodes. Thus, six episodes were carried over into the following broadcast run, bringing the second season to 19 episodes. ABC elected to air the six remaining episodes out of order, interspersing first and second-season episodes without regard to continuity. As a result, some multi-episode plot arcs (particularly James's appearance on Dancing with the Stars and June's travails at a new job outside the coffee shop) are almost incomprehensibly jumbled in the original broadcast order. For the second season, Ray Ford was upgraded to the main cast, after having recurring appearances in the first season.

On January 22, 2013, ABC announced the series' immediate removal from its schedule. The following day, the cast confirmed the series' cancellation. In February, star Krysten Ritter stated that she believed the remaining eight unaired episodes would be broadcast in the following summer. In April, the network confirmed that the eight episodes would be released online on iTunes, Hulu and ABC's website between May 17 and June 2. In July 2014, it was announced that Logo TV would broadcast the entire series in the correct order, including the eight unaired episodes, beginning July 19.

== Reception ==
=== Critical response ===
At the first ceremony of the Critics' Choice Television Award, on June 20, 2011, Don't Trust the B— in Apartment 23 was included among eight of the Most Exciting New Series, voted by television journalists who watched its pilots.

On review aggregator Rotten Tomatoes, the first season has an approval rating of 88% based on 41 reviews, with an average rating of 6.8/10. The website's general consensus reads, "An odd couple sitcom with a modern twist, Don't Trust the B— in Apartment 23 is sleeker and smarter than expected, thanks to strong acting and snappy dialogue." For the first season, Metacritic calculated an average of 71 out of 100 based on 29 reviews, indicating "generally favorable reviews".

The second season has an approval rating of 83% based on 12 reviews on Rotten Tomatoes, with an average rating of 7.3/10. The website's general consensus reads, "The unique pairing of Krysten Ritter and Dreama Walker continues to entertain in the second snarky season of Don't Trust the B—, which further hones its comedic voice and snide asides."

=== Ratings ===
Viewership and ratings per season of Don't Trust the B— in Apartment 23
Season	Timeslot (ET)	Episodes	First aired		Last aired		TV season	Viewership rank	Avg. viewers (millions)
Season	Timeslot (ET)	Episodes	Date	Viewers (millions)	Date	Viewers (millions)	TV season	Viewership rank	Avg. viewers (millions)
1	Wednesday 9:30 p.m.	7	April 11, 2012	6.91	May 23, 2012	5.60	2011–12	89	6.37
2	Tuesday 9:30 p.m. (1–7, 9, 11); Sunday 10:30 p.m. (8, 10)	19	October 23, 2012	4.20	January 15, 2013	2.73	2012–13	125	3.82

=== Awards and nominations ===
Year	Award	Category	Recipients	Result	Ref.
2012	Teen Choice Awards	Choice TV: Breakout Performance – Female	Dreama Walker	Nominated	
2012	Teen Choice Awards	Choice TV: Villain	Krysten Ritter	Nominated	
2012	Teen Choice Awards	Choice TV: Male Scene Stealer	James Van Der Beek	Nominated	
2012	Artios Award	Outstanding Achievement in Casting – Television Pilot – Comedy	Lisa Miller Katz	Nominated	
2013	Young Artist Award	Best Performance in a TV Series – Guest Starring Young Actress 11–13	Kiernan Shipka	Nominated	
2013	Young Artist Award	Best Performance in a TV Series – Guest Starring Young Actress Ten and Under	Danielle Parker	Nominated	

== International broadcast ==
Region	Premiere date	Network	Ref.
Canada	April 11, 2012	City	
United Kingdom	May 24, 2012	E4	
Ireland	May 24, 2012	E4	
Asia-Pacific	June 25, 2012	Star World	
Australia	September 3, 2012	Arena	
New Zealand	October 9, 2012	Four	
Ireland	November 8, 2012	RTÉ Two	
South Africa	June 4, 2013	MNET Series	
