= Sara Fletcher =

American actress

- Born: Sara Elizabeth Rebrovic; Ohio, U.S.
- Other name: Sara E. R. Fletcher
- Occupation: Actress
- Years active: 2006–present

Sara Fletcher (née Sara Elizabeth Rebrovic), and sometimes credited as Sara E. R. Fletcher, is an American actress. She played the lead roles in the Comedy Central television sitcom Secret Girlfriend and the 2011 independent thriller iCrime. She has appeared in a number of films (such as 2017 romantic comedy film Non-Transferable), guest star spots and television commercials, and has appeared in web series and internet hosting spots.

== Early years ==
Sara Fletcher was born Sara Rebrovic and grew up in Ross, Ohio. She received her B.A. in Theatre with a minor in Dance from Indiana University, and a second degree in Sign Language Interpreting from Pierce College in Los Angeles. In addition to modeling, Fletcher's initial film work included a number of web series such as A$$ Wipers, Inc. and Scatting with Giselle on livevideo.com, the Lonelygirl15 spinoff Redearth88, Atomic Wedgie's Secret Girlfriend, and Freemantle's Project V. Fletcher also served as the host of the initial seasons of Movie Mob on the Reelz Channel, although for the first two episodes she appeared as one of the 'mob,' Naked Girl.

== Secret Girlfriend ==
Secret Girlfriend was a first-person-point-of-view comedy series in which the viewer interacted with other characters (roommates, crazy ex-girlfriend, new 'Secret Girlfriend'). The series aired in October and November 2009 on Comedy Central, and each episode consists of two eleven-minute segments. Fletcher began her three-year-long journey to television series regular after she was cast in the earliest version of the show, a series of 10 'mobisodes' that ran on Sprint's cell phone media platform produced by Jay Rondot and Ross Novie for Fremantle Media. When Fremantle picked up 10 episodes for their website, atomicwedgietv.com, she again appeared as the titular character. Although the show was almost universally panned by critics, Fletcher herself was applauded for her performance. Time magazine praised her "spark and personality, for which she should get extra credit, having to spend 90% of her screen time pretending to be hot for a video camera."

== Further television work ==
Sara Fletcher has made a number of television guest star appearances, including on Grimm, Perfect Couples, The Glades, and Friends With Benefits, and as the voice of a character on Family Guy. On April 14, 2010 it was announced that Fletcher had replaced Kristin Kreuk in Josh Schwartz's comedy pilot for CBS, Hitched, just before the table read. In 2014, Fletcher appeared as series regular Mia Winters on BounceTV's One Love, a series filmed prior to the death of star Sherman Hemsley. The series reached a network milestone by reaching 1.1 million people, the largest audience in BounceTV history. In 2017 Fletcher also had a guest role as the voice of Ava Vitali on the daytime soap opera Days of Our Lives.

== Film work ==
Fletcher began appearing in a number of indie films in 2010 with A Numbers Game and The Hammer. She starred in iCrime as Carrie Kevin, a relative newcomer to Hollywood who makes a deal to expose the latest Internet cyber-lebrity as a fraud. Not surprisingly, the film was partially based on the experiences of Fletcher and writer/director Bears Fonte while promoting A$$ Wipers, Inc. and Scatting With Giselle a few years earlier. Although the film received mixed reviews, Fletcher was universally praised for performance. According to Jadedviewer, "Fletcher does such a good job of being the champion of anti-fakeiness it becomes addicting." Rock!Shock!Pop! said Fletcher "seems destined for bigger things... and she makes the film completely watchable even during the slower moments." Following iCrime, Fletcher appeared in several more indie features such as Beyond the Mat, Thirtyish, and The Asylum's version of Hansel & Gretel.

Fletcher re-teamed with director Fonte again to collaborate on the story, co-produce and star in the short science fiction thriller The Secret Keeper, which played 40+ film festivals. The film concerns a woman who collects people's secrets and seals them in jars, relieving them of guilt. One reviewer called Fletcher's work as producer and actress "magnificent in both aspects, simultaneously carnal and consecrated" and "magnetically gorgeous."

Fletcher has appeared in many other shorts and web series, several of which were produced by The Fine Brothers. She is currently a series regular on the first PBS digital narrative series, Frankenstein M.D., a modern, online video adaptation of Mary Shelley’s classic novel.

== Other work ==
Fletcher has appeared in numerous television commercials, most notably a KFC ad in which she said "Game Day Bucket Go Boom!" She also played the bride in a Diet Pepsi ad starring Sofía Vergara.

Fletcher received a bit of viral buzz when she played the lead subject in a 'social experiment' for Simple Pickup, appearing as a girl who looked one way in her Tinder profile, but quite different in real life.

In 2012, Fletcher worked on Resident Evil 6, providing the motion and facial capture performance for Sherry Birkin.

== Filmography ==
=== Film ===
| Year | Title | Role | Notes |
|---|---|---|---|
| 2008 | Anatomy of a Socially Awkward Situation | Sara | Short |
| 2010 | A Numbers Game | Jessica | |
| 2010 | The Hammer | Rachel the Interpreter | |
| 2010 | iCrime | Carrie Kevin | Also associate producer |
| 2011 | A Dream Within a Dream | Linda | Video |
| 2012 | Post-It | Hot Girl | Short |
| 2012 | The Secret Keeper | Also | Short; also producer, writer (story by) |
| 2013 | Beyond the Mat | Jennifer Sanders | |
| 2013 | Hansel & Gretel | Jane | Video |
| 2013 | 4Closed | Deputy Hendrix | Video |
| 2013 | Big Plans | Actress | Short |
| 2013 | One Day | Beatrice | Short; also editor |
| 2014 | The Trail's End | Bonnie | Short |
| 2014 | Precipitation | Sara | Short |
| 2014 | Moral Code | Lisa | Short |
| 2014 | College Fright Night | Brittany | |
| 2015 | Adulthood | Vanessa | |
| 2016 | A Beginner's Guide to Snuff | Sara | |
| 2016 | Misconduct | 911 Operator | |

=== Television ===
| Year | Title | Role | Notes |
|---|---|---|---|
| 2008 | Movie Mob | Host | Several episodes |
| 2008 | Monk | 2nd Gushing Fan | Episode: "Mr. Monk Gets Lotto Fever" |
| 2008 | Jimmy Kimmel Live! | Sign Language Interpreter | Episode: "#6.162" |
| 2008 | Merry Christmas, Drake & Josh | Sandy | TV movie |
| 2009 | Secret Girlfriend | Jessica | Series regular; 6 episodes |
| 2010 | Hitched | Rachel | Pilot |
| 2011 | Perfect Couples | Katie Cooper | Episode: "Perfect Jealousy" |
| 2011 | Friends with Benefits | Mia | Episode: "The Benefit of the Right Track" |
| 2012 | The Glades | Erica Sims | Episode: "Longworth's Anatomy" |
| 2012 | Family Guy | Kate / Lois' New Friend #1 | Voice role; episode: "The Blind Side", "Lois Comes Out of Her Shell" |
| 2012 | Shadow of Fear | Lisa | TV movie |
| 2013 | Grimm | Sarah Mahario | Episode: "One Night Stand" |
| 2014 | One Love | Mia Winter | Series regular; 8 episodes |
| 2014 | Frankenstein M.D. | Rory Clerval | Recurring role, 7 episodes |
| 2016 | House of Darkness | Kelly | TV movie |
| 2016 | Days of Our Lives | Jill | Recurring role; 6 episodes |
| 2017 | NCIS: Los Angeles | Cheryl | Episode: "767" |
| 2019 | Escaping the NXIVM Cult: A Mother's Fight to Save Her Daughter | Allison Mack | TV movie |

=== Video games ===
| Year | Title | Role | Notes |
|---|---|---|---|
| 2012 | Resident Evil 6 | Sherry Birkin | Motion and facial capture |
