= Right Now Kapow =

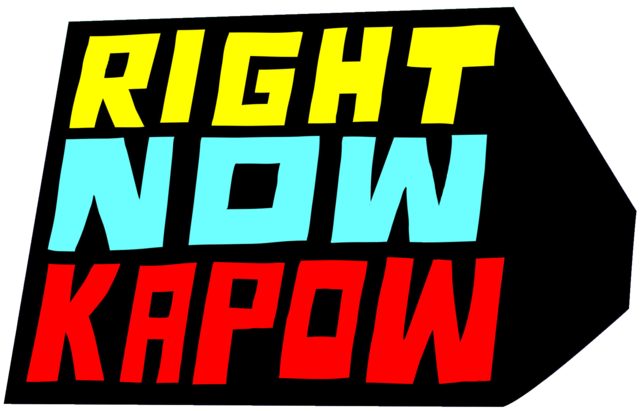
- Also known as: Airline Earth (original title)
- Genre: Sketch comedy
- Created by: Justin Becker; Marly Halpern-Graser
- Directed by: Devin Flynn
- Starring: Michael Blaiklock; Alana Johnston; Kyle Kinane; Emily Maya Mills; Betsy Sodaro; Baron Vaughn
- Theme music composer: Alessandro Tabora
- Composer: Alessandro Tabora
- Country of origin: United States
- Original language: English
- No. of seasons: 1
- No. of episodes: 26

Production
- Executive producers: Justin Becker; Marly Halpern-Graser; Sam Register
- Producer: Mark Marek
- Running time: 22 minutes
- Production company: Warner Bros. Animation

Original release
- Network: Disney XD
- Release: September 19, 2016 – May 31, 2017

Right Now Kapow is an American animated sketch comedy television series produced by Warner Bros. Animation for Disney XD. It is one of the few collaborations between Warner Bros. and Disney since Who Framed Roger Rabbit. The series premiered on September 19, 2016, and ended on May 31, 2017. The series was created by Justin Becker and Marly Halpern-Graser, who previously worked on the Cartoon Network series Mad. Becker also worked on Adult Swim's Infomercials, and Halpern-Graser also worked on Cartoon Network's DC Nation. On May 31, 2017, Disney XD discontinued the series after one season.

The series was announced back in 2014 under the title Airline Earth, but the creators felt that the title wouldn't work, so they went with Right Now Kapow.

== Overview ==
The series follows six headed friends, Ice Cream, Candy, Moon, Plant, Diamond and Dog, are going on new adventures every day as they find themselves in mischief, in a manner similar to the original Looney Tunes shorts. Each episode of the series has three main parts in 11-minute segments, along with other random shorts. The series has a style of humor similar to Cartoon Network's previous series Mad and Nickelodeon's The Ren & Stimpy Show.

== Cast ==
- Kyle Kinane as Ice Cream, a yellow male anthropomorphic ice cream cone.
- Alana Johnston as Candy, a pink female anthropomorphic bubble gum in a wrapper.
- Baron Vaughn as Moon, a teal male anthropomorphic crescent moon.
- Betsy Sodaro as Plant, a green female anthropomorphic palm tree.
- Emily Maya Mills as Diamond, a blue female anthropomorphic crystal diamond.
- Michael Blaiklock as Dog, an orange male anthropomorphic bulldog.

== Episodes ==
No.	Title	Directed by	Written by	Storyboarded by	Original release date	U.S. viewers (millions)
1	"Victory Speech/Magic Chair"	Devin Flynn & Sean Petrilak	Justin Becker, Josie Campbell, Steve Clemmons, Bryan Condon, and Marly Halpern-Graser	Garrett Davis, Adriel Garcia, Hae-Joon Lee, Lionel Ordaz, Jojo Ramos, and Wylder Tomlinson	September 19, 2016	0.20
A series of creatures fall down. Plant drops her pizza. A pharaoh puts friendship to the test. A reporter meets a giraffe. A teacher is rewarded for her years of service. A group of adventurers go on magical adventures with their magic weapons from a wizard, but one of the adventurers's weapon is a chair.
2	"Bash Master/All's Well"	Devin Flynn & Mark Marek	Justin Becker, Josie Campbell, Steve Clemmons, Bryan Condon, and Marly Halpern-Graser	Chris Burns, Garrett Davis, Bob Fox, Hae-Joon Lee, Lionel Ordaz and Wylder Tomlinson	September 20, 2016	0.18
Ice Cream the wrestler makes a career change. A chin is large. A woman claps her hooks. A bowler doesn’t know what she’s "pin" for. An elf and a princess weigh their options. A tricky wishing well ruins a laptop and Dog was stuck in the well for so long.
3	"R&B/The Sphinx"	Devin Flynn	Justin Becker, Josie Campbell, Steve Clemmons, Bryan Condon, and Marly Halpern-Graser	Dee Boyd, Andrew Dickman, Adriel Garcia, David Hofmann, Lionel Ordaz and Jojo Ramos	September 21, 2016	0.20
Moon and Plant are singers. A werewolf is not a mind reader. A little girl is the worst one of all. A garbage truck puts on a show. A party is much cooler than anticipated. Diamond the sphinx is such a drama queen and she's got a rival for Ice Cream, Dog and Candy.
4	"Crime Scene/The Bulkbodies"	Devin Flynn, Ken Mcintyre & Sean Petrilak	Justin Becker, Josie Campbell, Steve Clemmons, Bryan Condon, and Marly Halpern-Graser	Garrett Davis, Andrew Dickman, Adriel Garcia, David Hofmann, Hae-Joon Lee, Jojo Ramos, Wylder Tomlinson, Josh Weisbrod and Richard Wilkie	September 26, 2016	0.18
A detective investigates a robbery./A beautiful monster marries a charming shrimp.
5	"Pied Piper/Monster House Roommate"	Mark Marek, Ken Mcintyre, & Sean Petrilak	Justin Becker, Josie Campbell, Steve Clemmons, Bryan Condon, and Marly Halpern-Graser	Garrett Davis, Andrew Dickman, Chivaun Fitzpatrick, Adriel Garcia, David Hofmann, Hae-Joon Lee and Jojo Ramos	October 3, 2016	0.14
Plant can't get a song out of her head./Dog and Candy are moving to a house. A house is not allowed to throw any more parties.
6	"Truth or Dare/Sir Anthony"	Sean Petrilak	Justin Becker, Josie Campbell, Steve Clemmons, Bryan Condon, Marly Halpern-Graser, and Sam West	Andrew Dickman, Chivaun Fitzpatrick, David Hofmann, Hae-Joon Lee, Mike Nordstrom, Jojo Ramos and Wylder Tomlinson	October 10, 2016	0.11
Plant, Candy, and Diamond are having a slumber party and play truth or dare; Dog the knight is defined.
7	"The Expedition/The Blues"	Devin Flynn & Sean Petrilak	Justin Becker, Josie Campbell, Steve Clemmons, Bryan Condon, Marly Halpern-Graser, and Sam West	TBA	October 17, 2016	0.27
An expedition continues of Moon and Candy./Ice Cream blues star is born and Dog hates the blues.
8	"Mirage/Hansel Und Gretel"	Ken McIntyre	Justin Becker, Josie Campbell, Steve Clemmons, Bryan Condon, Marly Halpern-Graser, and Chris Sartinsky	Garrett Davis, Chivaun Fitzpatrick, Adriel Garcia, Brian Kaufman, Wylder Tomlinson and Josh Weisbrod	October 24, 2016	0.17
Ice Cream is lost in the desert./Diamond the witch gets her just deserts.
9	"College Prank War/Invisible Girlfriend"	Devin Flynn	Justin Becker, Josie Campbell, Steve Clemmons, Bryan Condon, Marly Halpern-Graser, and Chris Sartinsky	Andrew Dickman, David Hofmann, Kevin Lam, Hae-Joon Lee, Mike Nordstrom, and Jojo Ramos	November 28, 2016	N/A
Plant, Candy and Moon are a great team and a prank war escalates./Dog learns a lesson about love.
10	"Ugly Earthlings/The Dolphin"	Bryan Newton	Justin Becker, Josie Campbell, Steve Clemmons, Bryan Condon, Marly Halpern-Graser and Chris Sartinsky	Garrett Davis, Adriel Garcia, Wylder Tomlinson, and Josh Weisbrod	December 12, 2016	N/A
A team of heroes help an ally./Moon tries to repay a dolphin.
11	"Innocence of a Child/Story of a Life Boat"	Ken McIntyre	Justin Becker, Josie Campbell, Steve Clemmons, Bryan Condon, Marly Halpern-Graser, and Sam West	Andrew Dickman, Chivaun Fitzpatrick, Hae-Joon Lee, Mike Nordstrom, and Jojo Ramos	January 9, 2017	N/A
Ice Cream and Candy find hope in the words of a child./Moon, Dog and Plant are stuck on the island.
12	"Dragon Riders/Time Traveling Tourists"	Devin Flynn and Ken Mcintyre	Justin Becker, Josie Campbell, Steve Clemmons, Bryan Condon, and Marly Halpern-Graser	Garrett Davis, Geoffrey Johnson, Kevin Lam, Hae-Joon Lee, Mike Nordstrom, and Jojo Ramos	January 9, 2017	N/A
Ice Cream, Candy, Plant, and Dog are a group of adventurers (from "Magic Chair") who become the Dragon Riders./Diamond spoils her own future.
13	"Beach Detectives/Order Number Nine"	Ken McIntyre, Bryan Newton & Sean Petrilak	Justin Becker, Josie Campbell, Steve Clemmons, Bryan Condon, Marly Halpern-Graser, and Sam West	Garrett Davis, Chivaun Fitzpatrick, Adriel Garcia, Wylder Tomlinson, and Josh Weisbrod	January 9, 2017	N/A
A pair of detectives, Moon and Plant, go north of the boardwalk./A chicken sandwich is ordered.
14	"Sketchy Genie/Cat Man Has Nine Lives"	Devin Flynn, Ken Mcintyre, Bryan Newton, and Mike Nordstrom	Justin Becker, Josie Campbell, Steve Clemmons, Bryan Condon, Marly Halpern-Graser, and Chris Sartinsky	Dee Boyd, Garrett Davis, Andrew Dickman, Adriel Garcia, Ian Mark Stewart, Wylder Tomlinson, and Josh Weisbrod	January 9, 2017	N/A
Diamond meets Ice Cream the genie./Moon named Cat Man literally has nine lives.
15	"Secret Baseland/One Man Band"	Ken Mcinytre	Justin Becker, Josie Campbell, Steve Clemmons, Bryan Condon, and Marly Halpern-Graser	Chivaun Fitzpatrick, Geoffrey Johnson, Kevin Lam, Mike Nordstrom and Jojo Ramos	May 20, 2017	N/A
Dog the villain opens a theme park./Plant the one-man band breaks up.
16	"Prank School/Apple Seed vs. Bunyan"	Devin Flynn and Mike Nordstrom	Justin Becker, Josie Campbell, Steve Clemmons, Bryan Condon, Marly Halpern-Graser, and Jocelyn Richard	TBA	May 21, 2017	N/A
A headmistress pulls a prank./A tall tale stands tall.
17	"All Hands on Deck/Haunted Demolished House"	Devin Flynn, Mark Marek, Ken Mcinytre, Bryan Newton, Mike Nordstrom, and Sean Petrilak	Justin Becker, Josie Campbell, Steve Clemmons, Bryan Condon, and Marly Halpern-Graser	Garrett Davis, Adriel Garcia, David Hofmann, Brian Kaufman, Hae-Joon Lee, Ian Mark Stewart and Wylder Tomlinson	May 22, 2017	N/A
Captain Dog quits while he's ahead; waiter with a warning; a queen spies on her enemy; water main breaks; Diamond the ghost haunts a field.
18	"Sandman and Tooth Fairy/The Interrogation"	Ken Mcinytre	Georgie Aldaco, Justin Becker, Josie Campbell, Steve Clemmons, Bryan Condon, Marly Halpern-Graser, and Sam West	Garrett Davis, Chivaun Fitzpatrick, Geoffrey Johnson, Kevin Lam and Hae-Joon Lee	May 23, 2017	N/A
Candy steals magic sleep sand from Ice Cream as Sandman./ Candy won't name her accomplice.
19	"Conscience/All You Can Eat"	Ken Mcinytre and Mike Nordstrom	Justin Becker, Josie Campbell, Steve Clemmons, Bryan Condon, Marly Halpern-Graser, and Asterios Kokkinds	TBA	May 24, 2017	N/A
Plant weighs her options./A buffet line wages war its Moon, Diamond and Ice Cream vs Candy, Plant and Dog.
20	"Company Teamwork/Body Switch"	Ken Mcinytre and Mike Nordstrom	Justin Becker, Josie Campbell, Steve Clemmons, Bryan Condon, Marly Halpern-Graser, Asterios Kokkinds, and Jocelyn Richard	Garrett Davis, Adriel Garcia, Chivaun Fitzpatrick, Geoffrey Johnson and Hae-Joon Lee	May 25, 2017	0.87
Dog learns about teamwork./Ice Cream and Moon switch bodies.
21	"Ponce De Leon/Road Gang"	Mike Nordstrom	Justin Becker, Josie Campbell, Steve Clemmons, Bryan Condon, Marly Halpern-Graser, Asterios Kokkinds, and Chris Sartinsky	Dee Boyd, Adriel Garcia, Jojo Ramos, Ian Mark Stewart, Nate Theis and Josh Weisbrod	May 26, 2017	N/A
Moon and Ice Cream find the Fountain of Youth./A gang finds a theme.
22	"Keeping up With the Ramses/Assimilate"	Devin Flynn and Ken Mcinytre	Georgie Aldaco, Justin Becker, Josie Campbell, Steve Clemmons, Bryan Condon, and Marly Halpern-Graser	Garrett Davis, Chivaun Fitzpatrick, Geoffrey Johnson and Hae-Joon Lee	May 27, 2017	N/A
A lame pyramid./Dog resists a school full of cyborgs.
23	"The Infinite Library/Unfinished Business"	Ken Mcinytre, Bryan Newton and Mike Nordstrom	Georgie Aldaco, Justin Becker, Josie Campbell, Steve Clemmons, Bryan Condon, Marly Halpern-Graser, and Asterios Kokkinds	TBA	May 28, 2017	N/A
Moon learns his place./Diamond the ghost starts a business.
24	"The Devil's Gold Banjo/Jack in the Box"	Ken Mcinytre and Mike Nordstrom	Justin Becker, Josie Campbell, Steve Clemmons, Bryan Condon, Marly Halpern-Graser, and Thomas O'Donnel	Garrett Davis, Chivaun Fitzpatrick, Adriel Garcia, Geoffrey Johnson, Hae-Joon Lee and Ian Mark Stewart	May 29, 2017	N/A
Candy the banjo player makes a deal./A toy that kids have.
25	"Radical Mutants/My Fair Peasant"	Mike Nordstrom	Justin Becker, Josie Campbell, Steve Clemmons, Bryan Condon, Marly Halpern-Graser, Thomas O'Donnel, and Daniel Scheinert	Adriel Garcia, Jojo Ramos, Ian Mark Stewart and Josh Weisbrod	May 30, 2017	N/A
Diamond discovers a mutant rap crew./A peasant wins a wager.
26	"Nannies/Forces of Darkness"	Ken Mcinytre and Mike Nordstrom	Georgie Aldaco, Justin Becker, Josie Campbell, Steve Clemmons, Bryan Condon, Marly Halpern-Graser, and Chris Sartinsky	Garrett Davis, Chivaun Fitzpatrick, Adriel Garcia, Geoffrey Johnson, Hae-Joon Lee and Ian Mark Stewart	May 31, 2017	N/A
Moon hires crazy nannies for Candy and Dog./The group of adventurers (from "Magic Chair" and "Dragon Riders") are on Moon the evil wizard's side in a battle between good and evil, and they don't even know it.
