= Escaping the NXIVM Cult: A Mother's Fight to Save Her Daughter =

- Written by: Adam Mazer
- Screenplay by: Michelle Paradise
- Directed by: Lisa Robinson
- Starring: Andrea Roth; Jasper Polish; Sara Fletcher; Kristin Booth; Janet-Laine Green; Peter Facinelli
- Narrated by: Catherine Oxenberg
- Country of origin: United States
- Original language: English

Production
- Executive producers: Yfat Reiss Gendell; Richie Kern; Catherine Oxenberg; Judith Verno
- Producer: Michael Mahoney
- Cinematography: Silver Screen Pictures
- Running time: 87 minutes
- Production company: Sony Pictures Television

Original release
- Network: Lifetime
- Release: September 21, 2019

Escaping the NXIVM Cult: A Mother's Fight to Save Her Daughter is a 2019 A&E television movie that aired on September 21, 2019, as part of its "Ripped from the Headlines" feature film. The film is narrated by Catherine Oxenberg, who also serves as an executive producer, and stars Andrea Roth, Jasper Polish, Sara Fletcher, Kristin Booth, Janet-Laine Green, and Peter Facinelli.

On May 24, 2020, a "Special Edition" of the film aired that featured clips from the "Beyond the Headlines" short that originally followed the film's premiere where Gretchen Carlson interviewed Oxenberg.

== Plot ==
Catherine Oxenberg narrates about the day when she (Andrea Roth) found out that her daughter India (Jasper Polish) has joined the NXIVM cult that is headed by Keith Raniere (Peter Facinelli) and Allison Mack (Sara Fletcher). She goes to a place to find out advice for business but is asked odd questions.

== Cast ==
- Andrea Roth as Catherine Oxenberg
- Jasper Polish as India Oxenberg, Catherine’s oldest daughter.
- Sara Fletcher as Allison Mack
- Kristin Booth as Bonnie Vicente
- Janet Laine-Green as Princess Elizabeth
- Peter Facinelli as Keith Raniere, the leader of the NXIVM cult.
- Conrad Coates as Agent Dennis Lathan
- Trina Corkrum as Clare Bronfman
- Craig Gunn as Allison Mack's Lawyer
- Steve Lund as Casper Van Dien, Catherine’s second husband.
- David Mortimer as Lucas
- Kya Mosey as Victoria
- Sam Rosenthal as Frank Parlato
- Sean Skerry as Mark Vicente
- Amy Trefrey as Lauren Salzman
- Allison Busner as Sarah Edmondson
- Gabrielle Trudel as Remy Oxenburg, based on Catherine’s 16-year-old daughter at the time.
- Isabelle D. Trudel as Francesca Oxenburg, based on Catherine’s 14-year-old daughter at the time.

== Production ==
Catherine Oxenberg produced this film to show the viewers the experiences that her daughter India has gone through. Most of the scenes were filmed in Nova Scotia (the cafe and music school scenes filmed in Dartmouth, Nova Scotia, Canada).

== Reception ==
The movie averaged 916,000 viewers on the night it premiered.
