= Frank Meeink =

American activist and former white power skinhead gang member

- Born: Francis Steven Bertone; May 7, 1975 (age 51); South Philadelphia, Pennsylvania, U.S.
- Known for: Anti-hate lecturer and author
- Spouse: Allison Mack (m. 2025)

Frank Meeink (born Francis Steven Bertone; May 7, 1975) is an American activist and former white supremacist skinhead gang member. After a three-year stint in prison, he left the Neo-Nazi movement and now lectures against it.

== Early life ==
Born Francis Steven Bertone on May 7, 1975, in South Philadelphia, Meeink claims to have lived a violent and unpleasant childhood with a lack of a structured family. He is of Italian and Irish descent through his father and mother, respectively. His teenage parents, Frankie Bertone and Margaret Meeink, married after his birth. When he was 2 years old, his parents divorced and he moved in with his mother and her parents. His father unknowingly signed custody papers allowing his mother to change his last name to Meeink.

In his early childhood, he had no relationship with his biological father and had an abusive stepfather. Meeink's mother abused drugs and alcohol. When he was thirteen, his mother forced him to move out, and Meeink went to live with his father. Meeink attended Pepper Middle School, where most students were black. After witnessing a black gang brutally beat a white student, Meeink dropped out of Pepper. At age fourteen, Meeink was out with his cousin when he discovered the Neo-Nazi movement.

Much later in life, Meeink took a 23andMe test and discovered that he is 2.4% Ashkenazi Jewish from his mother’s maternal great-grandmother. Meeink had no idea of his Jewish ancestry until he left prison in the midst of his anti-hate work. While studying for a documentary, a rabbi helped Meeink discover his Jewish roots. He now claims to be an observant Jew. Meeink has said that he goes to Torah study classes three times a week, keeps kosher and attends synagogue.

== Life in prison ==
At 17, Meeink was arrested after he had nearly killed a man and had kidnapped another. Meeink used a gun in the kidnapping, which led to him being tried as an adult; he had recorded the attack on videotape. Meeink had also been arrested prior for smaller crimes, for these, he was sentenced to three years in prison. Meeink served his prison term near Springfield, Illinois.

Prison changed his life. He met people of many different ethnicities. Due to a shared interest in sports, Meeink became friends with many black prisoners. In games like football and basketball, Meeink earned the respect of fellow black inmates. Moreover, Meeink felt that the black inmates supported him more than the skinheads while in prison.

== Life after prison ==
After being released from prison, Frank tried to return to his past life, but realized that during his time in prison, he had learned that he did not have the same prejudices he had prior to his incarceration. He also continued to suffer from not having a stable home and was almost lost to drug addiction.

After Meeink served his prison sentence, he went back to where he had spent his childhood in South Philadelphia and by helping with the local hockey team, the Philadelphia Flyers, he created Harmony Through Hockey. This organization was created to give young kids a chance to stay out of the way of violence and have fun while participating.

He also visits schools and gives lectures on his life and how to avoid falling into violence and crime.

During a March 2021 interview on CNN, Meeink commented on the effect of Fox News:

Fox News has completely radicalized so many Americans. If you look at Fox News and then you compare that to hate radio from Rwanda, and what started that civil war, there’s comparisons there. We have to know that a lot of our fellow Americans, our fellow children of god, have been radicalized by a network of news. As a former radical, I can tell you, from watching Fox News all day, I can show you where they’re saying radical stuff that I used to say...instead of when I would say “Jews”, they say “Big Media”. They just swapped out a couple of words here and there.

In 2025, Meeink married American former actress Allison Mack, who used to be a member of NXIVM, a sex-trafficking cult, and served 22 months in prison for racketeering and racketeering conspiracy charges.

== Bibliography ==
- Meeink, Frank; Roy, Jody M. (2009). Autobiography of a Recovering Skinhead: The Frank Meeink Story. Portland, Oregon: Hawthorne Books. ISBN 978-0-9790188-2-4.
