= Michael Blaiklock =

American actor and writer

- Born: Ashland, Massachusetts, U.S.
- Other name: Mookie
- Occupations: Actor, writer
- Years active: 1993–present

Michael "Mookie" Blaiklock is an American actor and writer who has starred in the television series Secret Girlfriend and Don't Trust the B— in Apartment 23.

== Biography ==
Blaiklock was born and raised in Ashland, Massachusetts. While at Emerson College in Boston, he wrote and performed in the sketch group Swolen Monkey Showcase.

In addition to being a series regular on Secret Girlfriend and Don't Trust the B--- in Apartment 23, Blaiklock has appeared on It's Always Sunny in Philadelphia, The Sarah Silverman Program, Hung, Melrose Place, Desperate Housewives, and in the feature film Fired Up!.

Blaiklock was nicknamed Mookie as a child after NBA basketball player Mookie Blaylock. He is a frequent performer at the Upright Citizens Brigade Theater in Los Angeles, often with his sketch group A Kiss from Daddy.

== Filmography ==
Film
Year	Title	Role	Notes
2006	Awkward Moments	—N/a	Short film
2009	Fired Up!	Mookie	
2010	The Therapist	Himself	Short film
2011	Dog DNA	—N/a	Short film
2011	And They're Off	Carl Grahn	
2012	Guy Talk 2	—N/a	Short film; credited as Mookie Blaiklock
2014	Alexander and the Terrible, Horrible, No Good, Very Bad Day	Nagamaki Host	
2017	Cold War	Jon Chupp	Independent Feature Film

Television
Year	Title	Role	Notes
2006	Cheap Seats	Canadian Violent Hugger	Episode: "Amazing Games: International Toughmen"
2007	The Very Funny Show	Guy at party	Episode: "Future Me"; credited as Michael "Mooky" Blaiklock
2008	It's Always Sunny in Philadelphia	Fat street kid	Credited as Michael Blaiklock; episode: "Mac and Dennis: Manhunters"
2008	The Sarah Silverman Program	Trevor Kaufman	Episode: "I Thought My Dad Was Dead, But It Turns Out He's Not"
2009	Hung	Hammer	2 episodes
2009–2010	Melrose Place	Travis	2 episodes
2009	Secret Girlfriend	Sam	Main cast
2011	Breaking In	Chubby Thor	Episode: "Take the Movie and Run"
2011	Desperate Housewives	Father Benson	Uncredited; episode: "Secrets That I Never Want to Know"
2011	Supah Ninjas	Burke Pratt	Episode: "Snakeskin"
2012–2013	Don't Trust the B— in Apartment 23	Eli Webber	Main cast; 19 episodes
2012–2016	Comedy Bang! Bang!	Various	5 episodes
2015	Wet Hot American Summer: First Day of Camp	Danny	7 episodes
2015	Brooklyn Nine-Nine	Brian Hip	Episode: "The Mattress"
2016	Tween Fest	Riley	2 episodes
2016–2017	Right Now Kapow	Dog	Voice

Web series
Year	Title	Role	Notes
2009	Brainstorm	Marty Waxer	8 episodes
2010	Downers Grove	Brett	9 episodes; also creator
2010	Zombie Roadkill	Greg	6 episodes
2010–2011	The Back Room	Officer Gutwell	2 episodes
2011	Minor Stars	Robbie	3 episodes; also co-creator
2011	The Back Room	Michael Jackson	2 episodes
2011–2012	Inside the Master Class	Himself	10 episodes; credited as Mookie Blaicklock
2011	Roommate Meeting	Mookie	3 episodes; also creator and executive producer
2012	The Back Room	The Eggbeaters	Episode: "Paul F. Tompkins"
2016	Cuplicated	Husband	Short
