= Female mentorship =

Female mentorship is the mentoring of women by women to further their career and development prospects. A female mentor is sometimes called a femtor.

== Rhodes Project ==
The Rhodes Project, which examines the experience of female Rhodes Scholars, was created in 2004 by Ann Olivarius. Rhodes Scholars are chosen from around the world for graduate study at the University of Oxford. The project showcases research on the lack of career-support networks, based on interviews and data from female Rhodes Scholars who were born in the 1950s to 1980s and who earned graduate and professional degrees until the early 2000s. The project is interested in how this data reflects the current situation of women. One interviewee told the researchers: "It would have been helpful to really know to what extent things still haven’t changed for women. ... How I would have handled situations might have been different if I had understood what was going on behind the scenes. The blatant examples are something that you deal with but it’s the subtle things and understanding those that I would have worked through differently."

== See also ==
- Coaching
- Feminisation of the workplace
- Feminization (sociology)
- Occupational sexism
- Sexism
