= American United Entertainment =

- Company type: Private
- Industry: Film
- Founded: 2011
- Founder: Robert John Rodriguez
- Headquarters: Hollywood, California, USA
- Products: Film Production; Film Distribution

American United Entertainment also known as (American United Media) is a film production entertainment company with divisions in production, distribution, finance, film and television. IFA Distribution is a film distribution and International sales subsidiary of American United Entertainment. American United Entertainment was founded by Robert John Rodriguez in 2011.

== Overview ==
In 2016, American United Entertainment partnered with Han Capital Management on a $200 Million Dollar Fund for North American film and television projects.

In 2014 AUE produced and financed Bullet, starring Danny Trejo as the title character and Jonathan Banks as the villain.

In 2011, American United Entertainment started IFA Distribution and formed key strategic joint ventures with Intandem Films and Funimation Entertainment where they distributed films globally. In February 2011, AUE created a film financing fund (Feature Film Partners VII) Yahoo Finance[3] with former chairman and chief executive officer of Fox Filmed Entertainment, Bill Mechanic CEO of Pandemonium Films.

== Filmography ==
Year	Title	Director	Notes
2005	Confessions of a Pit Fighter	Art Camacho	Funding
2007	Lake Dead	George Bessudo	Funding
2008	Hotel California	Geo Santini	Funding
2008	Farm House	George Bessudo	Funding
2009	La Linea	James Cotten	Funding
2010	Across the Line: The Exodus of Charlie Wright	R. Ellis Frazier	Funding
2012	Path of Souls	Jeremy Torrie	Funding
2012	Back to the Sea	Thom Lu	Distributor
2013	Stag	'Brett Heard	Distributor
2013	Fish N Chips: The Movie	Dan Krech	Distributor
2014	Bullet	Nick Lyon	Producer/ Distributor
2015	The High Schooler's Guide to College Parties	Patrick Johnson	Distributor
