= Robert John Rodriguez =

American film producer

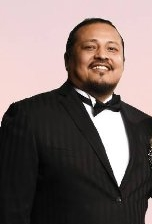
- Born: Robert John Rodriguez; Los Angeles County, California, U.S.
- Occupations: Film Producer, Executive, Banker, Financier
- Years active: 2005–present
- Known for: Managing Partner & CEO, American United Entertainment, producer
- Website: American United Media

Robert John Rodriguez is an American film and television producer, executive, financier, banker and CEO of American United Entertainment.

== Early life ==
Robert John Rodriguez was born in Los Angeles County, California. He is the son of Robert John Rodriguez, a professional football player for the Green Bay Packers, and his wife, Felicitas. He was raised in East Los Angeles and Hollywood. He spent most of his youth fighting in the ring as an amateur boxer and kickboxer. He also learned the classical music arts in orchestras and played with numerous bands on the Sunset strip. In Jr. High School, he enjoyed algebra and started programming software classes, which became his passion throughout high school as well.

== Career ==
Rodriguez is the CEO, producer, and managing partner of American United Entertainment. Rodriguez recently collaborated with Han Capital Management on a $200 million fund for North American-based projects. Rodriguez was the former CIO of Aldamisa Entertainment(Sin City 2 "Dame for a Kill", "Chef", "Machete Kills","Jayne Mansfield's Car").

In 2011, Rodriguez created a film financing fund (Feature Film Partners VII) Yahoo Finance with former chairman and chief executive officer of Fox Filmed Entertainment, Bill Mechanic CEO of Pandemonium Films. In 2016, he is also heading Media Divisions for Silverbear Capital and SBC Financial Group, Global PE companies out of Hong Kong.

== Filmography ==
Year	Title	Director	Notes
2005	Confessions of a Pit Fighter	Art Camacho	Executive producer
2007	Lake Dead	George Bessudo	Executive producer
2008	Hotel California	Geo Santini	Executive producer
2008	Farm House	George Bessudo	Executive producer
2009	La Linea	James Cotten	Executive producer
2010	Across the Line: The Exodus of Charlie Wright	R. Ellis Frazier	Executive producer
2012	Path of Souls	Jeremy Torrie	Executive producer
2012	Back to the Sea	Thom Lu	Executive producer
2013	Stag	Brett Heard	Executive producer
2013	Fish N Chips: The Movie	Dan Krech	Executive producer
2014	Machete Kills	Robert Rodriguez	SVP of Finance
2014	Bullet	Nick Lyon	Producer
2014	Chef	Jon Favreau	SVP of Finance
2015	Sin City: A Dame to Kill for	Robert Rodriguez	SVP of Finance
2015	The High Schooler's Guide to College Parties	Patrick Johnson	Executive producer

Television

Year	Title	Director	Notes
2016	Risk Takers: Reality Show	Joe Bohn	Executive Producer
