= Will to power (disambiguation) =

The will to power is a prominent concept in the philosophy of Friedrich Nietzsche and in the psychotherapy of Alfred Adler. The term may also refer to:

- The Will to Power (manuscript), a posthumous publication of Nietzsche's notebooks
- Will to Power (band), a dance music band from Miami whose name is taken from Nietzsche's concept
  - Will to Power (Will to Power album), an album by the band
- Will to Power (Arch Enemy album), an album by Arch Enemy
- Will to Power (film), a 2008 film
- Will to Power (comics), a comic book mini-series from Dark Horse
- Xenosaga Episode I: Der Wille zur Macht, a PlayStation 2 game

== See also ==
- Dominance (disambiguation)
- Power (social and political)
