= Robert Rodriguez (disambiguation) =

Robert Rodriguez (born 1968) is an American film director and screenwriter.

Robert Rodriguez may also refer to:

- Robert Rodriguez (gridiron football) (born 1981), American gridiron football coach
- Robert J. Rodriguez (born 1976), Democratic member of the New York State Assembly
- Robert Xavier Rodriguez (born 1946), American classical composer
- Robert N. Rodriguez, president of the American Statistical Association in 2012
- Robert Rodriguez (politician), Colorado state senator
- Robert John Rodriguez, American film and television producer
- Robert Neal Rodriguez (1950–1992), American serial killer and former police officer
- Robert Rodriguez (physician), American emergency physician

== See also ==
- Roberto Rodríguez (disambiguation)
