= Air attack =

Air attack may refer to:

- An Aerial firefighting mission or series of missions
- An airstrike, a military attack by aircraft against ground targets
- A strategic bombing air raid
- Fighter Ace (video game), also called "Air attack", a 1997 flight simulator by Microsoft
- AirAttack, video game developed and published by Art In Games in 2010
- Air attack, slang for an offensive strategy using primarily forward passes in Canadian and American football
