= Mark Petrie =

- Born: 20 May 1979 (age 47); Auckland, New Zealand
- Genres: Film scores, orchestral, contemporary
- Occupation: Composer
- Years active: 2002–present
- Website: http://www.markpetrie.com

Mark Petrie (born 20 May 1979) is a New Zealand film, television and video game composer. He is best known for composing the music in trailers for Guardians of the Galaxy, Life of Pi, Mission Impossible: Ghost Protocol, Sherlock Holmes: A Game of Shadows, Avengers: Infinity War, and Venom, as well as writing the score for EA Sports' Madden NFL American football video games. He has also composed scores for films, television shows, documentaries, political campaigns and sporting events.

== Early life and influences ==
Petrie was born and raised in Auckland, New Zealand. He began his early musical training while boarding at Dilworth School for eight years, studying piano and composition. After winning a scholarship to study film scoring at the Berklee College of Music in Boston, Massachusetts, he relocated to the United States, and completed a degree majoring in film scoring.

== Career ==
After graduating from Berklee College of Music, Petrie was awarded the BMI Foundation's Pete Carpenter Film Composing Fellowship. He was flown to Los Angeles to work under the Grammy Award-winning composer Mike Post. He then began writing for TV shows and independent films. In 2007, he collaborated with PostHaste Music to compose music for trailers. He went on to compose dozens of tracks for them. He is known for "infusing contemporary elements on top of epic orchestral writing", and his tracks were used in many projects through stock music websites (Output.com).

In 2012, he released his first album 'Genesis', featuring 27 tracks in the "modern, epic orchestral style showcased in his work in trailers for The Amazing Spider-Man, Green Lantern, The Twilight Saga: Breaking Dawn – Part 2, Mission: Impossible – Ghost Protocol, and Battleship." In 2021, several of Petrie's tracks were added to the main entrance area music of Epcot.

Fan made music videos featuring Petrie's music began to surface on YouTube around 2010 and many have amassed millions of views.

== Filmography / Discography ==
=== Trailers ===
Year	Title	Role	Notes
2011	Green Lantern	Composer: trailer music	
2011	Mission Impossible: Ghost Protocol	Composer: trailer music	
2011	Sherlock Holmes: A Game of Shadows	Composer: trailer music	
2012	Lockout	Composer: trailer music	
2012	Life of Pi	Composer: trailer music	
2012	The Twilight Saga: Breaking Dawn Part 2	Composer: trailer music	
2012	The Hobbit: An Unexpected Journey	Composer: trailer music	
2013	Oz the Great and Powerful	Composer: trailer music	
2013	Jack the Giant Slayer	Composer: trailer music	
2013	Oblivion	Composer: trailer music	
2014	Noah	Composer: trailer music	
2014	Guardians of the Galaxy	Composer: trailer music	
2014	Into the Storm	Composer: trailer music	
2014	Selma	Composer: trailer music	
2015	Insurgent	Composer: trailer music	
2015	Tomorrowland	Composer: trailer music	
2015	The Walk	Composer: trailer music	
2016	The Fifth Wave	Composer: trailer music	
2016	The Finest Hours	Composer: trailer music	
2016	Zoolander 2	Composer: trailer music	
2016	The Last King	Composer: trailer music	
2016	Allegiant	Composer: trailer music	
2016	Command and Control	Composer: trailer music	Documentary
2016	Alice Through the Looking Glass	Composer: trailer music	
2016	The BFG	Composer: trailer music	
2016	Blood Father	Composer: trailer music	
2016	The Secret Life of Pets	Composer: trailer music	
2016	Independence Day: Resurgence	Composer: trailer music	
2016	Deepwater Horizon	Composer: trailer music	
2016	Miss Peregrine's Home for Peculiar Children	Composer: trailer music	
2016	Overwatch	Composer: trailer music	Video game
2016	Deepwater Horizon	Composer: trailer music	
2017	Borg vs McEnroe	Composer: trailer music	
2017	Downsizing	Composer: trailer music	
2017	Blade Runner 2049	Composer: trailer music	
2018	Avengers: Infinity War	Composer: trailer music	
2018	Venom	Composer: trailer music	
2019	Avengers: Endgame	Composer: trailer music	
2024	‘’Flow’’	Composer: trailer music	

=== Films ===
Year	Title	Role	Notes
2002	Minimal Knowledge	Composer	
2003	Cafe and Tobacco	Composer, music producer, musician, orchestrator	Won: Columbine Award at the 2004 Moondance International Film Festival
2003	Cog	Composer	Short film
2003	Wasted	Composer	TV movie documentary
2003	A Stranger Within	Composer	Video
2004	Once Upon a Jedi	Composer	Short film
2004	Mums Behind Bars	Composer	TV movie documentary
2004	Two Women and Two Babies	Composer	TV movie documentary
2004	O Destino	Composer	Short film
2005	Swamper	Composer	
2005	Without You	Composer	Short film
2005	Thug	Composer	Short film
2006	The Sand Creek Massacre	Composer	Video documentary
2006	Knife Shift	Composer	Short film
2006	A Different Light	Composer	Short film
2006	The Naked Ape	Composer	
2006	Dumpster Diver	Composer	Short film
2006	Blame Falls	Composer	Short film
2007	The Road to Empire	Composer	
2007	Jay and Seth Versus the Apocalypse	Composer	Short film
2007	Lake Dead: Behind the Scenes	Composer	Video documentary short
2007	Mr. Blue Sky	Composer	
2007	Lake Dead	Composer	
2007	Polly and Marie	Composer	TV movie
2007	Watching the Detectives	Composer: additional music, writer: "B Team", "Behind Enemy Lines", "Dream Spinner"	
2008	Valley of Angels	Composer	
2008	The Tell Tale Heart	Composer: theme music, composer	Short film
2008	Johnny Appleweed	Composer	
2008	A 1000 Points of Light	Composer	Video
2008	Apron Strings	Composer	
2008	Pittsburgh Passion	Composer	
2008	Farmhouse	Composer	
2008	Black	Composer	Short film
2008	Knocked Down	Composer	Short film
2009	Tender as Hellfire	Composer	Short film
2009	Mortal Kombat	Composer	Documentary
2009	The Rift	Composer	Short film
2009	No Strings Attached	Composer: stock music	
2010	Officer Down	Composer	Short film
2010	Native Time	Composer	Short film
2010	God's Fools	Composer	Short film
2010	El Dorado	Composer	Short film
2010	Play On	Soundtrack	
2010	Kill's Hollow	Composer: stock music	Video
2010	Wrong Side of Town	Performer: "Acquisition", writer: "Acquisition"	Video
2010	Some Days Are Better Than Others	Performer: "Reality TV Show Music: Furnace, Nailbiter, Dismissal", writer: "Reality TV Show Music: Furnace, Nailbiter, Dismissal"	
2010	Cool It	Writer: "Swamp Monster"	Documentary
2011	Kin	Composer	Short film
2011	Constitutional Literacy with Michael Farris	Composer	Documentary
2011	The Repressed	Composer	Short film
2011	Cast Alaska	Composer	
2011	Love Eterne	Writer: "Swirling"	
2012	A Dangerous Place	Composer	Video
2012	Kyren and the Mysterious World of Sight	Composer	Documentary short
2012	Three Paces Flat	Composer	Short film
2012	The Backpack	Composer	
2012	Unconditional	Composer, music mixer	
2012	Future Hope	Composer	Short film
2013	DICE Awards Intro Film	Composer	Short film
2013	Strangers	Composer	Short film
2013	Side Effects	Composer: additional music	
2013	This Is the End	Composer: additional music	
2014	The Calling	Composer: additional music, performer: "Winter Sets In", writer: "Winter Sets In"	
2017	Razor	Composer	
2018	American Mirror	Composer	

=== Television ===
Year	Title	Role	Notes
1996	Fox Major League Baseball	Composer: additional music	
2003	Big West Conference: NCAA Basketball	Composer: additional music	
2007	The Millen Baird Show	Composer: additional music	
2007	American Idol	Composer: additional music	5 episodes
2007	American Idol Extra	Composer: additional music	5 episodes
2007	My Super Sweet 16	Composer: additional music	1 episode
2007	Sjukhuset	Composer: theme music	1 episode
2007	Made	Composer: additional music	2 episodes
2007	Cribs	Composer: additional music	2 episodes
2006–07	Entourage	Composer: additional music	2 episodes
2006–07	The Simple Life	Composer: additional music	20 episodes
2008	The Real World Awards Bash	Composer: additional music	TV special
2008	The Janice Dickinson Modeling Agency	Composer: additional music	1 episode
2008	The Millen Baird Show	Composer	
2006–08	The Oprah Winfrey Show	Composer: additional music	3 episodes
2009	UFO Hunters	Composer: additional music	2 episodes
2009	Burn Notice	Composer: additional music	1 episode
2009	16 and Pregnant	Composer: additional music	1 episode
2009	The Real Housewives of New Jersey	Composer: additional music	6 episodes
2009	Surf Patrol	Composer: additional music	1 episode
2009	How Do I Look?	Composer: additional music	1 episode
2009	Dogs 101	Composer: additional music	2 episodes
2009	Gone Too Far	Composer: additional music	1 episode
2007–09	Real World	Composer: additional music	52 episodes
2007–09	The Best Damn Sports Show Period	Composer: additional music	12 episodes
2007–09	Keeping Up With the Kardashians	Composer: additional music	31 episodes
2008–09	Making the Band 4	Composer: additional music	5 episodes
2008–09	Fox NFL	Composer: additional music	5 episodes
2010	Teen Cribs	Composer: additional music	3 episodes
2010	Parental Control	Composer: additional music	1 episode
2010	The Robert Verdi Show Starring Robert Verdi	Composer: additional music	1 episode
2010	Cougar Town	Composer: additional music	1 episode
2010	True Life	Composer: additional music	1 episode
2010	Funny or Die Presents	Composer: additional music	1 episode
2010	Moving In	Composer: additional music	1 episode
2009–10	Quiero mis quinces	Composer: additional music	2 episodes
2011	Curb Your Enthusiasm	Composer: additional music	1 episode
2008–14	Attitude	Composer	
2017	Darryl: An Outward Bound Story	Composer	
2018	Impossible Builds	Composer: additional music	1 episode
2018	Westworld	Composer: additional music	1 episode

=== Video games ===
Year	Title	Role	Notes
2010	AirAttack	Composer: soundtrack	Video game
2014	Madden NFL 15	Composer	Video game
2016	Overwatch	Composer: trailer music	Video game
2016	Madden NFL 16	Composer: additional music	Video game
2017	Madden NFL 17	Composer: additional music	Video game

== Awards and nominations ==
In 2004, Petrie won the Columbine Award at the Moondance International Film Festival for the 2003 film Cafe and Tobacco, shared with Michael Justiz. In the same year, he was awarded the Pete Carpenter Fellowship.

In 2018, he won the ASCAP Screen Music Award for Top Television Series for The Bachelor and The Bachelorette.
