= AirAttack 2 =

2015 shoot 'em up video game

- Developer: Art In Games
- Publishers: Art In Games; Soco Games (2014 release)
- Composer: Johannes Bornlöf
- Engine: Unity
- Platforms: iOS, Android, OS X
- Release: 5 December 2015: CN: 25 September 2014
- Genre: Shoot 'em up
- Modes: Single-player, multiplayer

AirAttack 2 (also known as AirAttack 2 - WW2 Airplanes Shooter or 空战英豪2 ) is a 2015 shoot 'em up video game developed by Slovak studio Art In Games (Colya Games) for iOS, Android and OS X. It is a sequel to the 2010 game AirAttack.

The game was initially released on 25 September 2014 on Chinese Chinajoy expo and released worldwide on 5 December 2015.

== Gameplay ==
AirAttack 2 is a top-down shoot 'em up video game. Like its predecessor AirAttack, player control of various types of war planes such as F4U Corsair, Spitfire, Yak-1, P-40 Tigershark, P-38 Lightning and P-51 Mustang. Special variations of the F4U Corsair Spitfire, P-38 lighting, Yak-3, P-40 Tigershark and P-51 Mustang is also included and use the superweapons as primary weapon. Aside from traditional arcade based game, the game is fully 3D rendered with HDR graphics. AirAttack 2 introduced a tail gunner, missiles, bombs, lasers, wingmen and flamethrowers. AirAttack 2 has 22 campaign levels, and originally a survival mode set in Japan as well as daily challenges to a friend in survival mode.

Upon completing each mission, player awarded silver ingots and increase ranks as objectives properly accomplished.

== Development ==
AirAttack 2 was first announced by Colya Games CEO in Chinajoy in 2014 event where he said that the game will contain unique enemies and abilities that returned from AirAttack like a timewarp, and originally contain 60 levels. However, this have been dropped in the global release, but not in the Chinese release.

The OSX/macOS version was released on 14 December 2016. Although, the Mac App Store page for it disappeared after 2019, the version is still integrated with the iOS version in the App Store.

AirAttack 2 has 30 orchestral music mostly composed by Swedish composer Johannes Bornlöf (aka Bonnie Grace), an artist from Epidemic Sound.
