= Roberto Rodríguez =

Roberto Rodríguez may refer to:

- Roberto Rodríguez (director) (1909–1995), Mexican film director
- Roberto Rodríguez Mercado, Mexican politician, governor of Guerrero (1971)
- Bobby Rodríguez (bassist), bassist on Afro
- Roberto Juan Rodríguez, Cuban-born American jazz and Klezmer-fusion percussionist
- Roberto Rodríguez (baseball) (1941–2012), Venezuelan former pitcher in Major League Baseball
- Roberto Rodríguez (football manager), Mexican former manager of Club América
- Roberto Rodríguez (volleyball) (born 1986), beach volleyball player from Puerto Rico
- Roberto Rodríguez (water polo) (born 1951), Cuban Olympic water polo player
- Roberto Rodríguez (footballer), Swiss footballer

== See also ==
- Robert Rodriguez (disambiguation)
