= Sugar Creek (film) =

2007 film

- Directed by: James Cotten
- Written by: James Cotten
- Starring: Dustin Alford; Kevin Gage; Robert Miano; Daniel Kruse
- Cinematography: John Patrick McCauley
- Music by: David Itkin
- Production companies: Dark Highway Films; MagniForge Entertainment
- Release date: 2007
- Country: United States
- Language: English

Sugar Creek is a 2007 American Western supernatural film directed by James Cotten and starring Dustin Alford, Kevin Gage, Robert Miano and Daniel Kruse. It is set in 1889 and was filmed in Arkansas.

== Premise ==
Sugar Creek follows Adam Stanton as he awakes, alone in a field and without his shoes. Setting out in search of help he finds the local townspeople to be afraid of him.

== Cast ==
- Dustin Alford as Young Adam Stanton
- Jeff Bailey as Abe McGovern
- Kevin Gage as Sheriff Worton
- Jake Glascock as Kevin
- Adam Huss as Lawrence
- Dayton Knoll as Kane St. Clair
- Daniel Kruse as Adam Stanton
- Robert Miano as Pete St. Clair
- Joshua Payne as Jacob
- David Pickens as The Pastor
- Gary Ragland as John Malory
- Sarah Swofford as Evelyn
