= Punk Love =

- Directed by: Nick Lyon
- Written by: Nick Lyon
- Produced by: Luca Callori di Vignale; Egidio Veronesi; Nick Lyon
- Starring: Chad Lindberg; Emma Bing; Max Perlich
- Cinematography: René Richter
- Edited by: Nick Lyon
- Music by: Miles Mosley
- Release date: March 4, 2006
- Country: United States
- Language: English

Punk Love is a 2006 independent film focusing on a romance between two people haunted by abuse and addiction. Punk Love was directed and written by Nick Lyon, and stars Chad Lindberg and Emma Bing.

== Plot ==
Raped by her step-father, Sarah with her boyfriend, Spike, run away to Portland by trying to convince her step-uncle to give them money by showing him pictures of him drug dealing. Their plan failed and her step-uncle tries to kill both of them but Sarah gets away to find his secret stash of money she found three years ago. They settle in a motel room where bass-player Spike finds a band audition ad in the newspaper. On the way walking to the audition, Spike and Sarah get into a fight, leaving Sarah waiting in the rain on the side of the road. A cab driver offers Sarah a free ride home, saying its dangerous especially for little girls to be alone at this time of night. Eventually, she gets into the front seat of the car. The cab driver seems nice at first and asked a few questions but Sarah, tired and annoyed, tells him to stop and just drop her off. The cab driver drives to a deserted area under the bridge, then beats and rapes her. Spike comes back to the motel room to find Sarah naked and highly beaten under the shower.

Spike, nervously waiting, asks the nurse if he could see Sarah. The nurse says no due to regulations until her parents come. He sneaks into her room and comforts her as she sleeps. The same nurse walks in tells him to leave. He pitifully says she is my girlfriend and shrugs. After kissing her forehead he leaves and he falls asleep in the hallway. He wakes up to cops, one of them being Sarah's step-uncle, cuffing him for statutory rape while Sarah's parents behind them. The jury gives him one last chance to accept the consequences and admit to guilt. Spike attacks Sarah's step-dad screaming, you destroyed her and this is your fault while four cops try to hold him down. He remains not guilty and is sent to jail for a year. Sarah's step-dad walks in the room to find Sarah cutting herself. He feels up and down her leg telling her to stop making her mom worry and be a good girl. She repeatedly tells him to get out. She wakes up to find Spike knocking at her window. They kiss and Spike tells her to pack her stuff but hears Sarah's step dad walking towards her room. Spike hides until he hears Sarah screaming get off of me then bangs at the window telling him to get off. Sarah's step-dad eventually gets on top of Spike and starts choking him. Sarah shoots her step-dad in front of her mom. She eventually tells her mom that he has been molesting her. Spike and Sarah steal his car until they reach Portland under the bridge where they beat his car.

They get more money and stay the night at a fancy hotel. They get married. They run out of money and try to find more ways to get money but fail. They walk to Spike's home to tell his mother goodbye forever. They plan on going to California. They walk until they find shelter at an abandoned motel. Sarah's mom visits Spike's mom and they talk. Sarah's mom and ex-step-uncle finally find where Spike and Sarah are staying. They struggle but keep running though Sarah's mom and ex-step-uncle are literally going 1 mph right behind them. The couple quickly escape with them following behind. They run towards the bridge where they are surround by cops and Sarah's mom. Spike tells her he loves her then both put their hands in the air. Spike is shot directly in the chest by Sarah's ex-step-uncle. Sarah quickly runs to Spike. Sarah's mom realizes what true love is with Sarah's ex-step-uncle in shock. Sarah walks toward the edge of the bridge and jumps.

== Cast ==
- Chad Lindberg as Spike
- Emma Bing as Sarah
- Max Perlich as Officer Lawson

== Release history ==
The film premiered at the 2006 Cinequest Film Festival followed by the Cannes Film Market on May 16, 2007, and the Drake International Film Festival on June 25, 2007.
