= Love Eterne (2011 film) =

- Love Eterne film poster
- Directed by: Joseph Villapaz
- Written by: Joseph Villapaz
- Produced by: Joseph Villapaz
- Starring: Melissa Navia; James Gill; Bonnie Piesse; Romy Valentina; Francesco Plazza; Terilyn Marshelle-Fleming; Jorell Stills Haigler; Andre Correa; Julio Perez; Joseph Villapaz
- Cinematography: Joseph Villapaz
- Edited by: Joseph Villapaz
- Release date: February 19, 2011 (Anthology Film Archives)
- Running time: 50 minutes
- Country: United States
- Language: English
- Budget: $10,000

Love Eterne is a 2011 romantic comedy film written and directed by Joseph Villapaz, and starring Melissa Navia and James Gill. It takes place in New York City. It received two Awards of Merits and an Honorable Mention at film festivals.

== Plot ==
Medina (Melissa Navia) gets up after hearing a voice in her dreams. She prepares to go out, has a coffee, and does a quick breath relaxation exercise. Her friend, Sidonia (Bonnie Piesse), arrives and finds Medina, who is looking at herself in the mirror with a sad expression. Sidonia tries to lighten the moment, and reminds Medina that her friends and family are waiting for her. Medina gets herself together and they head off to the funeral service for Medina's fiancé.

Medina is with her friend Tesla (Romy Valentina), who tells her she is love with Medina's brother, Enzo (Francesco Plazza), and is thinking of getting engaged. Medina is a bit surprised, but congratulates her. They try to visit an art exhibit, but the female security guard kicks them out, as she remembers the duo's wild reputation. Medine is upset, but Tesla invites her and Enzo for drinks. Tesla and Enzo cheer Medina up with their light conversation.

Quinn (James Gill) looks depressed as he meets up with his friend Fera (Terilyn Marshelle-Fleming) at the street. He tells her that Nilda left him and took everything, including his possessions. He shows her the "Dear John letter" composed on bath tissue. Fera's husband, Camden (Jorell Stills Haigler), arrives and they explain the situation. Fera and Camden console Quinn but he leaves to clear his mind. They follow Quinn to make sure he does not do something regretful.

Tesla reminds Medina of an upcoming martial arts promotion test. Medina prepares by doing some stretching, practicing footwork, and twirling weapons including swords, staffs and spears. Meanwhile, Fera is increasingly concerned about Quinn. Camden notes that Fera and Quinn act like siblings, but for now, all they can do is continue to look after Quinn. They head to a show at the Lincoln Center.

For the promotion exam, Medina must knock Master down once before she is knocked down three times. In the first round, Medina goes down quickly after losing her balance from a kick to her thigh. In the second round, she falls from a palm strike to her chest. As she gasps for air, Tesla and Enzo show concern. Medina quickly plans a better offense, and wins the next round. Master promotes her and gives her some words of wisdom.

Some weeks later, Enzo and Tesla catch up to Medina and tell her they are now engaged. They are worried about Medina's isolation but Medina ensures them she is dealing with things. Enzo reminds Medina about the upcoming meeting at Françoise's restaurant. Camden and Fera look after Quinn, while Tesla and Enzo worry about Medina.

Medina visits Sidonia, who works as a psychic. Sidonia tells Medina she will meet someone and be happy, but she must allow herself to fall in love again. Medina meets her ex-boyfriend, Jarrod, who is engaged to Lumina. He shows Medina some pastries which he learned how to make back when they were a couple, and wishes her a happy thirtieth birthday by "toasting" her with cannolis. Meanwhile, Quinn sniffs his Dear John letter one last time, and throws it in a garbage bin.

As she finishes a workout and prepares to leave, Medina senses a presence. She turns around and addresses the voice that sounds like Master, and is reminded of his advice at the exam. She encounters Sidonia, who is sitting on a chair, on the city sidewalk and meditating. Sidonia reminds her of the party later; Medina thanks her and walks off. Quinn and Fera see Sidonia and ask for directions. She provides it and gives Quinn a pack of tissues to clean his camera lens.

At Françoise's, Medina talks to the voice and they agree to part ways. Fera interrupts the conversation as she recognizes Medina as her favorite fashion designer. Camden calms Fera down, but Quinn is stunned upon seeing Medina, and Medina is likewise frozen. They break their trance; Medina is about to cry; Quinn offers her a tissue from the pack that Sidonia gave him. As Medina takes one, Quinn apologizes for disturbing her and walks away. Medina smells the tissue and is full of joy; she quickly turns and requests another from Quinn, who eagerly gives her the whole pack. Camden and Fera inform Quinn that their dinner reservations were denied because of a party. Medina realizes it is the same party that Enzo mentioned, so it must be for her. She invites Quinn, Camden and Fera to her party, and they excitedly accept. As they begin to walk away, Medina looks to the sky and smiles. With tissue in hand, she turns and joins Quinn and the others.

== Cast ==
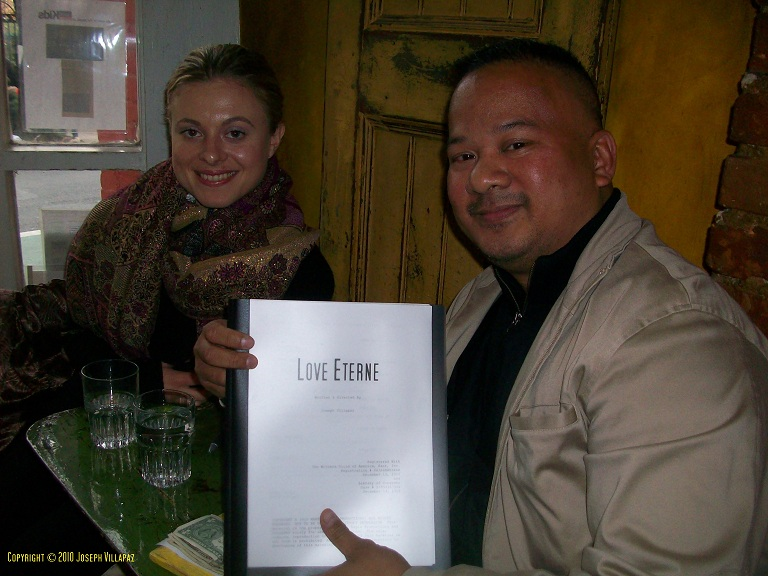
Bonnie Piesse and director Joseph Villapaz

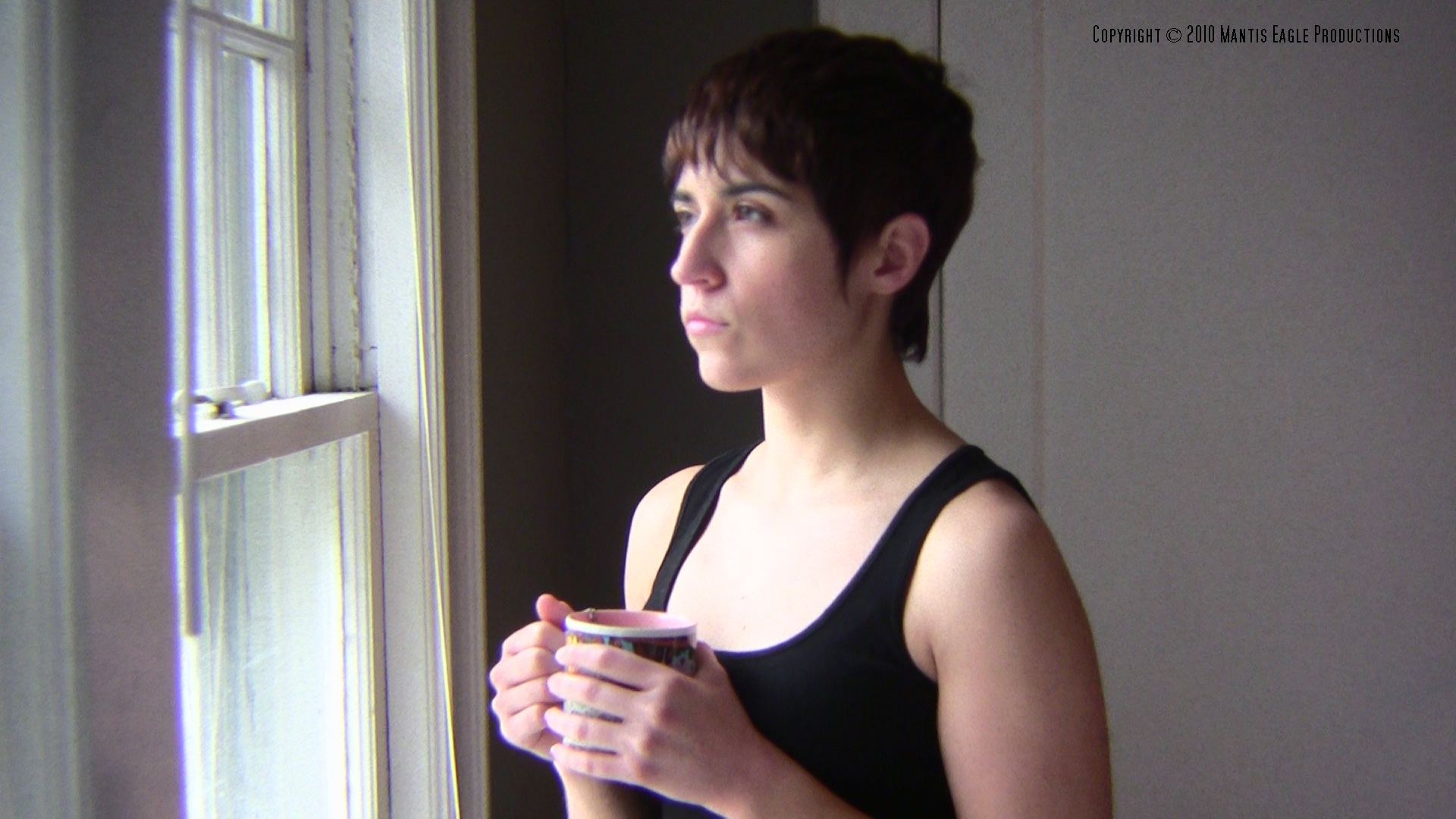
Melissa Navia as Medina

- Melissa Navia as Medina
- James Gill as Quinn
- Bonnie Piesse as Sidonia - In an interview with Backstage, Piesse noted that she was looking for a spiritually fulfilling role and liked that the character was a psychic. "She's always giving words of wisdom to the lead character, and I really resonated with what she was saying."
- Romy Valentina as Tesla
- Francesco Plazza as Enzo
- Terilyn Marshelle-Fleming as Fera
- Jorell Stills Haigler as Camden
- Andre Correa as Jarrod
- Julio Perez as Master
- Joseph Villapaz as the Waiter

== Soundtrack ==
The following tracks are in Love Eterne:

- "There For Me" - Bonnie Piesse, performer
- "Swirling" - Mark Petrie, composer
- "Bason Journe" - Jørn Lavoll, composer
- "Ghost Processional" - Kevin MacLeod, composer
- "Time Passes" - Kevin MacLeod, composer
- "Atlantean Twilight" - Kevin MacLeod, composer

The following tracks are in Love Eterne mourning:

- "Long Note - One" - Kevin MacLeod, composer
- "There is Romance" - Kevin MacLeod, composer
- "Touching Moments Two - Higher" - Kevin MacLeod, composer
- "Time Passes" - Kevin MacLeod, composer

== Release ==
On January 27, 2011, Villapaz posted a press release on PRWeb for the film. Bonnie Piesse interviewed with Backstage writer Dan Lehman. She described her music and film career, and her in role in Love Eterne. From April–December 2011, Villapaz submitted the film to various film festivals.

== Reception ==
Mark Bell of Film Threat cited numerous technical issues that detracted from the film. While he anticipated the film because on the cheerful Friends-like opening credits that resembled a television pilot, Bell considered the audio horrible for almost all of the movie, and was annoyed by the smudges on the camera lens for some of the scenes. Despite this, he considered Navia's performance of value when you can hear her. Duane L. Martin of Rogue Cinema also noted the audio problems and sound control, as well as the smudges. However, Richard Propes of The Independent Critic sympathized with the film's low $10,000 budget. He likened Navia's performance to Marisa Tomei and found the soundtrack music choices good. "There are bad reviews where I'd say 'Don't see this film!' and there are bad reviews where I lean more towards 'Give this filmmaker a chance. He's learning.' Love Eterne strikes me as a 'teachable moment' film for a new filmmaker learning his way around the obstacles and challenges of ultra-indie filmmaking."

== Awards and nominations ==
The film received some accolades among the film festivals. It received an Award of Merit in the Short Film category from The Accolade and from the Best Shorts competitions. It was an Honorable Mention in the Narrative Feature category for the second edition of the 2011 Los Angeles Movie Awards. It was officially selected by the New York International Independent Film & Video Festival and NewFilmmakers New York, for screening in November and December, respectively, in New York City.

== Love Eterne Mourning (2013 film) ==
In 2013, with newer technology available, director Joseph Villapaz re-edited the film's scenes from scratch, and fixed the sound quality flaws from the previous release. A new opening scene was completed which contains the voice of Troiano (portrayed by Henry Martinez), the deceased fiancé. The text boxes which originally garnered negative reviews was also removed. Villapaz also added new music. The short was submitted to film festivals with the title LOVE ETERNE mourning and became an Official Selection at the Wizard World Film Festival in Portland. The Bare Bones International Film Festival screened LOVE ETERNE mourning on April 5, 2014. It won the award for Best Family Dramedy Micro Short on April 13, 2014.

== Remembering Love Eterne (2019 film) ==
In January 2019, a music video titled, Remembering Love Eterne, began appearing at film festivals. The film contains numerous clips from Love Eterne to music composed and arranged by director Joseph Villapaz using the Feel Good sound pool licensed from Producer Planet. As of February 24, 2019, the film has won Best Music Video from the Calcutta International Cult Film Festival, Festigious International Film Festival and the South Cinematographic Academy Film & Arts. Additionally, it has received an Outstanding Achievement award from the Cult Critic Movie Awards, and Honorable Mention awards from the New York Film Awards and the Top Shorts Film Festival.
