= Bermuda Tentacles =

- DVD cover
- Genre: Action; Adventure; Comedy; Horror; Sci-Fi; Thriller
- Screenplay by: Geoff Meed
- Directed by: Nick Lyon
- Starring: Linda Hamilton; Trevor Donovan; Mýa; Jamie Kennedy; John Savage
- Country of origin: United States
- Original language: English

Production
- Producers: Paul Bales; David L. Garber; David Michael Latt; Michael Meilander; Karen O'Hara; Cody Peck; Chris Regina; David Rimawi; Thomas P. Vitale
- Cinematography: Alexander Yellen
- Editor: Rob Pallatina
- Running time: 89 minutes
- Production company: M. O. B. Movies

Original release
- Network: Syfy
- Release: April 12, 2014

Bermuda Tentacles is an American made-for-television science fiction comedy-horror film directed by Nick Lyon. It stars Linda Hamilton and features an ensemble cast of Trevor Donovan, Mýa, John Savage and Jamie Kennedy. The movie premiered April 12, 2014 on the Syfy channel and garnered largely negative reviews.

== Plot ==
When Air Force One goes down over the Bermuda Triangle, the Navy sends its best rescue team. A terrible storm forces the president to leave in his escape pod, which ends up 7,000 meters (23,000 ft) below the sea. But before they can save the President, the team awakens a series of tentacles from a monstrous underwater ogrot, which threatens North America's entire Eastern Seaboard and, ultimately, the world.

== Cast ==
- Linda Hamilton as Admiral Hansen
- Trevor Donovan as Trip Oliver
- Mýa as Lieutenant Plummer
- John Savage as President DeSteno
- Jamie Kennedy as Dr. Zimmer
- Richard Whiten as Lieutenant Commander Barclay
- Ricco Ross as Captain Phillips
- Jeff Rector as Captain Warren
- Robert Blanche as Captain Dave Williams
- Angelique Cinelu as Ensign Sanchez
- Luke White as Stephen Hondo
- Stephanie Cantu as Rivas
- Yorick Veenma as Colonel Poppe De Boer
- James Craig as Aunt Penelope
- William McMahon as Fitz
- Darren Anthony Thomas as Greg Elfman
- Craig Blair as C.P.O. Vincent

== Home media ==
Bermuda Tentacles was released to DVD on September 9, 2014.

== Reception ==
Writing for online website HorrorNews.Net, Shawn Handling gave the movie a highly negative review and concluded, "I think it’s one of the worst that has been produced and should have been sunk with the rest of those missing ships."
