= Bonnie Piesse =

Australian actress

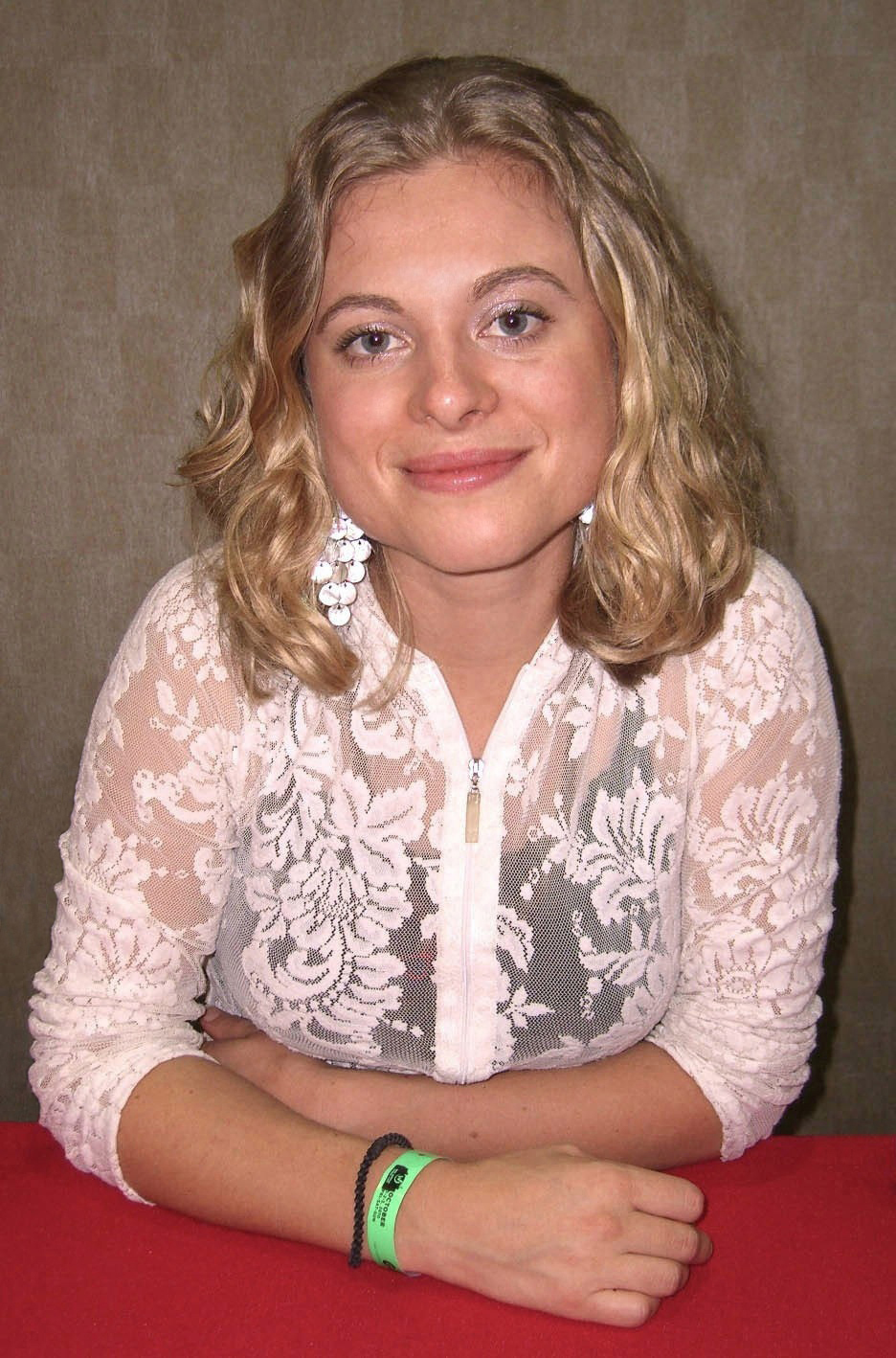
- Piesse at the Big Apple Convention in 2010
- Born: 10 August 1983 (age 43); Melbourne, Australia
- Occupations: Actress; singer
- Spouse: Mark Vicente

Bonnie Piesse (born 10 August 1983) is an Australian actress and singer. Her breakthrough role was playing a trapeze artist in the Australian children's television series High Flyers at the age of 15. After this she was scouted by George Lucas to play a young Beru Lars in Star Wars: Episode II – Attack of the Clones (2002) and Episode III – Revenge of the Sith (2005), a role she reprised in the Disney+ series Obi-Wan Kenobi (2022). She also had recurring roles on Blue Heelers, Horace and Tina, Stingers, and Last Man Standing.

== Early life ==
Piesse attended the Melbourne Rudolf Steiner School in Australia where she developed a love for the performing arts and honed her skills as a singer and songwriter. She was the "Top Class Performance of Dance, Drama, Music Performance: Solo, Group and Theatre" for her school and "Top Acts".

== Career ==
=== Actress ===
Piesse was cast as Donna in High Flyers when she was 15. She learned the trapeze and Spanish web for the role and took six months off school for the shoot. She then went on to play Alicia in Horace and Tina, had a recurring role in Stingers, and guest starred in Blue Heelers and Last Man Standing. She subsequently appeared in Star Wars: Episode II – Attack of the Clones and Episode III – Revenge of the Sith as Beru Lars (Luke Skywalker's aunt).

In January 2011, Piesse completed shooting her scenes for the romantic comedy, Love Eterne. She plays Sidonia, a psychic, mentor and confidant to the female lead, Medina, played by Melissa Navia. Her song, "There for Me" is featured in it. After completing its film festival run, Love Eterne has won awards at the Los Angeles Movie Awards, Best Shorts Competition and The Accolade Competition. It was an official selection at the New York International Independent Film & Video Festival (20 November 2011) and NewFilmmakers New York Annual Christmas Show (13 December 2011).

In December 2017, The Actors Awards nominated Piesse for Best Supporting Actress for her role in Love Eterne Mourning, a short film made from a couple of her scenes from Love Eterne.

On March 29, 2021, it was announced that Piesse would return to her role as Beru Lars in the Disney+ series Obi-Wan Kenobi. When first approached about returning to the Star Wars universe by the show's director Deborah Chow, Piesse was not actively pursuing acting roles; she and her husband were living in Europe, focused on dealing with their exit from ESP/NXIVM. "[S]ome roles are an easier fit than others. And this one just fits so easily that I didn’t feel I had to try too hard to embody [Beru]," Piesse told ELLE. "The main way to prepare was just—after everything I’d been through, I was still recovering from PTSD. So I did a lot to heal and nourish myself and strengthen myself to make sure that I had all the energy that I needed to be on set. So it was more supporting myself."

=== Singer and songwriter ===
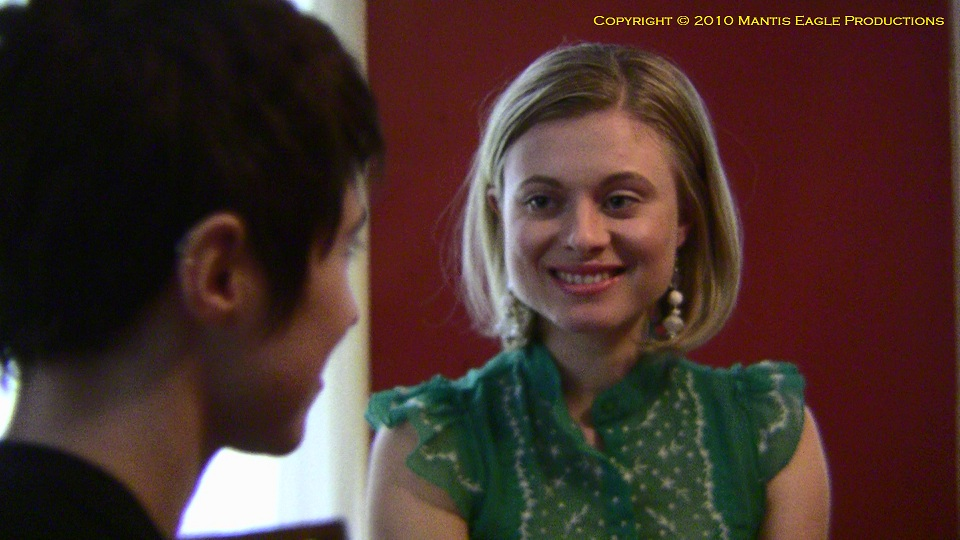
Piesse as Sidonia with Melissa Navia in a scene from Love Eterne.

Piesse's song "All I Have" was featured in two episodes of the CW television series Life Unexpected in 2010.

Bonnie recorded "Bittersweet EP" with Producer Emile Kelman and her song "Ariella" won the Singer Songwriter Category of the UK Songwriting Contest in 2013, alongside Lisa Nelson for her song, "Butterfly."

Another one of her songs, "There for Me", is featured in the romantic comedy, Love Eterne.

Piesse recorded a cover of Dream State (Brighter Night) by Son Lux for opening credits of The Vow.

== Personal life ==
Piesse is married to South African filmmaker Mark Vicente. Piesse and her husband were members of the self-described American multi-level marketing company and cult NXIVM. The couple left the organization in 2017 and became outspoken detractors. Their departure from the cult is documented in The Vow, a documentary series for HBO directed by Jehane Noujaim and Karim Amer.

== Selected filmography ==
=== Film ===
Year	Title	Role
2002	Star Wars: Episode II – Attack of the Clones	Beru Whitesun Lars
2005	Star Wars: Episode III – Revenge of the Sith	Beru Whitesun Lars
2011	Love Eterne	Sidonia
2022	My Favorite Girlfriend	Molly

=== Television ===
Year	Title	Role	Note
1999	High Flyers	Donna	26 episodes
1999, 2001	Blue Heelers	Various	2 episodes
2005	Last Man Standing	Kit	
2013	Twisted Tales	Samantha	
2020	The Vow	Herself	
2022	Obi-Wan Kenobi	Beru Whitesun Lars	2 episodes
