= Kevin Gage (actor) =

American actor (born 1959)

- Born: Kevin Gaede; May 26, 1959 (age 67); Wisconsin, U.S.
- Occupation: Actor
- Years active: 1984–present
- Spouses: Kelly Preston (m. 1985; div. 1987) Shannon Perris-Knight (m. 2006; died 2014)
- Children: 1
- Website: kevingage.com

Kevin Gage (born May 26, 1959) is an American character actor best known for his role in the crime film Heat (1995), in which he portrayed the murderous rogue criminal Waingro. His other roles have included United States Navy SEALs instructor Max Pyro in the military film G.I. Jane (1997), and Detective Mike Gage in the police thriller Strangeland (1998).

== Personal life ==
Gage was married to actress Kelly Preston from 1985 to 1987. On July 30, 2003, Gage was sentenced to 41 months in federal prison, starting September 29, 2003, along with two co-defendants, for cultivating marijuana, despite possessing a California-issued license to cultivate medicinal marijuana. Gage stated that he grew medicinal cannabis to help him cope with chronic pain from injuries suffered in a 1993 car crash, as well as for a sister with cancer and a brother with multiple sclerosis. He was released on March 17, 2006, assessed by the prison authorities as having been a "model prisoner." During his time inside, other inmates took to calling him "Waingro."

Gage married Shannon Perris-Knight in March 2006; their son was born in January 2007. Perris-Knight was diagnosed with inoperable brain cancer in 2008 and died in 2014.

== Filmography ==
=== Film ===
Year	Title	Role	Notes
1986	SpaceCamp	Counselor #2	
1987	Steele Justice	Army Sergeant	
1989	The 'Burbs	Cop	
1994	Last Resort	Killer	Direct-to-video
1995	Heat	Waingro	
1997	Con Air	Billy Joe	Uncredited
1997	G.I. Jane	Instructor Max Pyro	
1997	Double Tap	Agent Burke	
1998	Gunshy	Ward	
1998	Point Blank	Joe Ray	
1998	Strangeland	Detective Mike Gage	
1999	Junked	Crow	
2000	Ricky 6	Pat Pagan	
2001	Blow	Leon Minghella	
2001	Ticker	Payton "Pooch" Stad, Bomb Squad Expert	
2001	Knockaround Guys	Brucker	
2002	May	Papa Canady	
2002	American Girl	Deputy Richard	
2004	Lightning Bug	Earl Knight	
2004	Paparazzi	Kevin Rosner	
2005	Chaos	"Chaos"	
2007	Cosmic Radio	Hank	
2007	Sugar Creek	Sheriff Worton	
2007	Big Stan	Bullard, Prison Guard	
2008	Amusement	Tryton	
2008	Exact Bus Fare	McManus	
2009	Kill Theory	The Killer	
2009	Born That Way	Jake Green	
2009	Laid to Rest	Tucker Smith	
2009	La Linea	"Wire"	
2010	The Killing Jar	Hank	
2010	Happiness Runs	Hypnotist	
2010	Chasing 3000	Short Order Cook	
2013	American Girls	Judge Joe Gordon	
2014	The Gambler	The Gambler	
2015	Fear Clinic	Gage	
2015	Misfortune	Mallick	
2015	Jurassic City	Doyle	
2016	My Father, Die	"Tank"	
2021	Escape from Black Water		
2023	Crossfire	Stranger	
TBA	The Owl in Echo Park	TBA	Post-production
TBA	Painter	Evan Cain	Pre-production
TBA	The Senate Hearing	Riley Cohen	Announced

=== Television ===
Year	Title	Role	Notes
1986	Highway to Heaven	Boy #1	Episode: "Children's Children"
1987	Werewolf	Actor	2 episodes
1988	L.A. Law	Calvin Sholes	Episode: "Romancing the Drone"
1995	Renegade	Richie Pasko	Episode: "Den of Thieves"
1996	Nash Bridges	Unknown Role	Episode: "Night Train"
1998	Martial Law	Dwight Merill	Episode: "Breakout"
1999	V.I.P.	Frank Newsom	Episode: "Valma and Louise"
2001	Going to California	Actor	Episode: "Apocalypse Cow"
2002	Firefly	Stitch Hessian	Episode: "Jaynestown"
2003	Smallville	Pine	Episode: "Insurgence"
2006	CSI: Miami	Charlie Pelson	Episode: "Dead Air"
2006	Love's Abiding Joy	John Abel	Television film
2007	The Nine	Finn Stanton	Episode: "Legacy"
2013	Banshee	Lance Mangan	2 episodes
2014	Sons of Anarchy	Hench	Episode: "Red Rose"
2015	Amnesia	Tom	Episode: "Awakening"
2024	John Mulaney Presents: Everybody's in LA	Waingro	Episode: "Earthquakes"

=== Video games ===
Year	Title	Voice role	Notes
2013	Call of Duty: Ghosts	Gabriel Rorke	
2022	Call of Duty: Vanguard	Gabriel Rorke	
