= Kenn Woodard =

American actor (born 1961)

- Born: August 12, 1961 (age 64); New Orleans, Louisiana, U.S.
- Occupations: Film actor, stage actor
- Years active: 2004 - present

Kenn Woodard (born 1961) is an American actor.

== Career ==
Woodard started acting at the age of fourteen in his home state of Louisiana. He began his professional career on the New York stage as Poe, in the Writer's Theater production of The Raven, about the life of Edgar Allan Poe and has continued his professional work in both national and international media markets.

== Trivia ==
- Kenn is a certified hypnotherapist, writer, director, producer, and poet. His life is dedicated to using the arts as a collaborative tapestry of collective healing.

== Filmography ==
- The Sowers (2012) (short)
- Duel of Legends (2012) as Rooftop Guard 2
- Will to Power - The Perfect Murder (2008) as Mr. Conner
- Night Watcher (2008) as Brent King
- The Gift (2008) as Father
- The Ruby Scorpion (2007) as James
- Lake Dead (2007) as Priest
- Ng (2006) (short) as Leonard Lake
- The Executives (2006) as John LaSalle
- The Erotic Samurai (2006) as Jake Boughnect P.I.
- Expert Insight: Beating Blackjack (2006) (documentary) as Griff
- MUD (2005) as Kevin
- Breaking in Unlocked Doors (2005) as Daddy
- Guiana 1838 (2004) as Thomas
