= Nick Lyon =

American film director

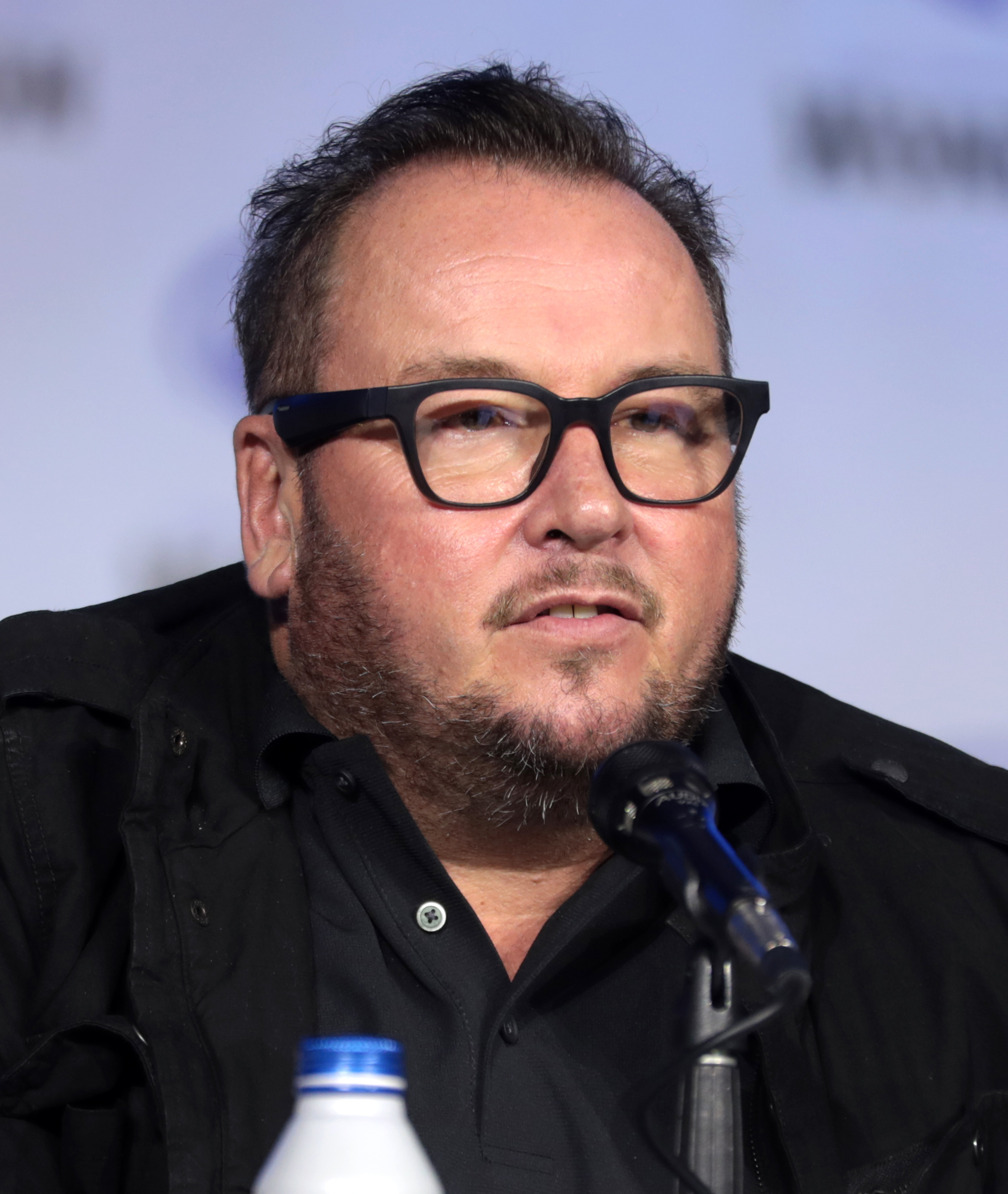
- Lyon at the 2022 WonderCon
- Born: April 25, 1970 (age 56); Pocatello, Idaho, U.S.
- Occupations: Film director, screenwriter
- Children: Parker Lyon

Nick Lyon (born April 25, 1970) is a Los Angeles–based film director and screenwriter. A native of Pocatello, Idaho, he spent nine years in Germany where he attended the renowned Film Academy Baden-Württemberg in Ludwigsburg, Germany.

In Germany, Lyon went on to direct Academy Award winner Maximilian Schell in I Love You, Baby, a thriller produced by Warner Bros. Lyon has since directed numerous international films and award-winning independent films. Lyon is the winner of the DGA Directors Award at Moondance, for his independent film Punk Love. His credits include Grendel and Annihilation Earth for NBC/Universal, Species: The Awakening for MGM and North Sea for RTL Germany.

== Filmography ==
- I Love You, Baby (2000)
- Punk Love (2006)
- Grendel (2007)
- Species: The Awakening (2007)
- Annihilation Earth (2009)
- Bermuda Triangle North Sea (2011)
- Zombie Apocalypse (2011)
- Rise of the Zombies (2012)
- Foreclosed (2013)
- Bullet (2014)
- Bermuda Tentacles (2014)
- Hercules Reborn (2014)
- They Found Hell (2015)
- Stormageddon (2015)
- The Other Wife (2016)
- Isle of the Dead (2016)
- Earthtastrophe (2016)
- Operation Dunkirk (2017)
- Shockwave (2017)
- Rent-an-Elf (2018)
- D-Day: Battle of Omaha Beach (2019)
- The Boy, the Dog and the Clown (2019)
- Best Christmas Ball Ever (also known as Christmas in Vienna) (2019)
- The Rebels of PT-218 (2021)
- The Surprise Visit (2022)
- English Estate (2022)
- Titanic 666 (2022)
- Aisle Be Home for Christmas (2022)
- On Fire (2023)
- Continental Split (2024)
- Til Death Do Us Part (2024)
- President Down (2025)
- Cruel Love (2026)
- Do You Want to Play? (2026)
