= On Fire =

On Fire may refer to:

== Film and television ==
- On Fire, a 1996 Hong Kong film directed by Clarence Fok
- "On Fire" (Law & Order: Criminal Intent), a television episode
- On Fire, a 2023 American thriller film directed by Peter Facinelli and Nick Lyon
- Soul on Fire (film), 2025 biographical film directed by Sean McNamara

== Literature ==
- On Fire (book), a 2019 non-fiction book by Naomi Klein
- On Fire: A Teen Wolf Novel, a 2012 novel by Nancy Holder
- On Fire, a 1993 memoir by Larry Brown

=== Albums ===
- On Fire (The Cottars album), 2004
- On Fire (Galaxie 500 album), 1989
- On Fire (The Higher album), 2007
- On Fire (The Lights Out album) or the title song, 2012
- On Fire (Mastercastle album), 2013
- On Fire (Michel Camilo album) or the title song, 1989
- On Fire (Peter Furler album), 2011
- On Fire (Spiritual Beggars album), 2002
- On Fire (Stetsasonic album) or the title song, 1986
- On Fire (T-Connection album) or the title song, 1978
- On Fire!, by Petra, 1988
- On Fire (EP), by Alec Empire, 2007
- On Fire, by the Kaʻau Crater Boys, 1995
- On Fyre, by Lyres, 1984

=== Songs ===
- "On Fire" (Blue Zone song), 1987
- "On Fire" (Lil Wayne song), 2009
- "On Fire" (Lloyd Banks song), 2004
- "On Fire" (Loïc Nottet song), 2018
- "On Fire" (The Roop song), 2020
- "On Fire" (Stefanie Heinzmann song), 2015
- "On Fire", by Bizzy Bone from Heaven'z Movie, 1998
- "On Fire", by Carmada, 2014
- "On Fire", by Eminem from Recovery, 2010
- "On Fire", by Franka Batelić, 2011
- "On Fire", by Garbage from No Gods No Masters, 2021
- "On Fire", by Lightning Bolt from Wonderful Rainbow, 2003
- "On Fire", by Luke Bond featuring Roxanne Emery, 2014
- "On Fire", by Modjo from Modjo, 2001
- "On Fire", by Redman from Muddy Waters, 1996
- "On Fire", by Sebadoh from Harmacy, 1996
- "On Fire", by Spiritualized from Let It Come Down, 2001
- "On Fire", by Switchfoot from The Beautiful Letdown, 2003
- "On Fire", by Tone Lōc from Lōc-ed After Dark, 1989
- "On Fire", by Van Halen from Van Halen, 1978
- "On Fire", by Young Thug from Beautiful Thugger Girls, 2017

== Other uses ==
- "On Fire", a 2013 strip of the webcomic Gunshow, origin of the "This is fine" internet meme

== See also ==
- Fire
- On the Fire, a 1919 American short comedy film featuring Harold Lloyd
