= AirAttack =

2010 shoot 'em up video game

- App store icon
- Developer: Art In Games
- Publisher: Art In Games
- Composer: Mark Petrie
- Platforms: iOS, Android
- Release: 15 July 2010
- Genre: Shoot 'em up
- Mode: Single-player

AirAttack (also branded AirAttack HD or AirAttack 1 - Airplane Shooter) is a 2010 shoot 'em up video game developed by Slovak studio Art In Games. It was released on Android and IOS devices on 15 July 2010.

Set in World War II, player controls three fighter planes, the F4U Corsair, P-38 Lightning and a Yakolev Yak-3. The game main objective is destroying the entire Nazi German and Japanese materiel, cities and military facilities to demise them. In 2015, its sequel AirAttack 2 was released with enhanced graphics, additional features and levels.

On 3 June 2026, the developers re-released the game as a remastered and optimized version for modern devices, featuring updated models from the sequel and upscaled assets from the original.

== Gameplay ==
Player controls planes and faces terrestrial, naval and aerial attacks

AirAttack is a top-down World War II shoot 'em up game where player controls three fighter planes, the F4U Corsair, P-38 Lightning and a Yakolev Yak-3. Both P-38 Lightning and Yakolev Yak-3 have special ordnance such as flamethrower and fireball. Player controls the aircraft with objective of destroying Nazi German and Japanese facilities and military material, either dragging their finger across screen, mouse and keyboard or specialized gamepad in supported devices (analogue stick or D-pad), that can dodge enemy planes to avoid collision.

Double tapping the screen results in dropping nuclear bomb that can damage numerous objects below the flight such as landed planes, tanks, defense towers, trains and other structures. Player may use landscape and portrait mode for better experience. They can collect items in mid-flight to increase firepower, speed, health or defense as well as in-game gadget offers various arsenals such as homing rockets, super rockets, turrets, shields, side planes, lightnings, bombs that can destroy wider area, extra lives, cannons, and time wraps (provides slow motion technique). AirAttack features three modes with 8 campaign levels in different locations. At the end of each campaign, player encounters boss battle.

A preview AirAttack Lite version offers only 3 levels. AirAttack soundtrack was performed by New Zealand artist Mark Petrie, known by his alias name 1M1 Music.

== Reception ==
AirAttack

Aggregate scores
Aggregator	Score
GameRankings	78.75%
Metacritic	84/100

Review scores
Publication	Score
148Apps	4/5
AppSpy	5/5
Common Sense Media	4/5
Multiplayer.it	9/10
Pocket Gamer	6/10
Slide to Play	3/4

The game received generally positive reviews from critics. Aggregating review website GameRankings provides an average rating of 78.75% based on 4 reviews, whereas Metacritic provides an average rating of 84 out of 100 based on 6 reviews, meaning generally favorable reviews.

Touch Arcade notes "AirAttack departs from the traditional 2D platform of vertical shoot-em-ups and opts for a fully realistic 3D world", creating a point of difference from other similar games of this nature.

== Sequel ==
In September 2014, Chinese Chinajoy expo announced the sequel game, AirAttack 2, released on 5 December 2015. Having similar gameplay mechanic, the game has been critically acclaimed with enhanced HD graphics, additional planes such as Spitfire, Yak-1, Yak-3 and P-51 Mustang, 22 campaign levels and survival mode. It has built in multilayer mode.
