= James Cotten =

American film director

- Born: February 12, 1974 (age 51); Fort Smith, Arkansas, United States
- Occupation(s): Actor, film director, film producer and writer

James Cotten (born February 12, 1974) is an American actor, film director, film producer, and writer.

== Early life ==
Cotten was born in Fort Smith, Arkansas., later moving to Sallisaw, Oklahoma.

While working at a local television station in Fort Smith, Arkansas, Cotten produced a story on a film being shot in the area, The Tuskegee Airmen (1995). He was cast as a bomber pilot.

== Film career ==
Cotten first studied film making at the London International Film School, in London, England. He later studied at The Los Angeles Film School, graduating in 2002. He studied cinematography with many working professionals: Rex Metz (SWAT, I Spy), Dave Klein (Chasing Amy, Clerks II), and Michael Barrett (CSI, Bobby, Kiss Kiss Bang Bang). He studied production design with Lawrence Paull (Blade Runner, Escape from L.A., Unlawful Entry) and direction with Paul Verhoeven (RoboCop, Starship Troopers), Donald Petrie (How to Lose a Guy in 10 Days, Miss Congeniality), Danielle Suissa (Pocahontas, Neowolf), and Brad Battersby (Red Letters, Jesus the Driver).

Shortly after graduating from the L.A. Film School, Cotten directed a Roger Corman film called Demon Slayer, a co-production with the school. The movie was released direct to DVD in 2003. It currently appears on the Sci-Fi Channel.

After the completion of Demon Slayer, Cotten returned to Van Buren, Arkansas and formed Dark Highway Films, an independent film company which produced its first direct to video release in 2007. Sugar Creek is a low-budget film that is part fairy tale and part morality tale. Sugar Creek was nominated at the Bare Bones International Film Festival for Best Drama/Thriller, and was best in state at the Little Rock Film Festival. Its direct to DVD release was on July 24, 2007.

Cotten was cast in an acting role opposite Ashley Judd in Joey Lauren Adams' Come Early Morning, playing a past one night stand named Steve.

In 2008, Cotten directed the film La Linea (The Line). Set in the rich and atmospheric backdrop of Tijuana, Mexico, La Linea is full of action and drama and finds its soul in the plight of the characters that inhabit the most dangerous city in North America. The film stars Andy García, Ray Liotta, Armand Assante, Danny Trejo, and Esai Morales. La Linea premiered at the American Film Market in 2008, where it was touted by The Hollywood Reporter as one of six films to watch. The film had limited theatrical release in July 2009, as part of a Latino Film Series sponsored by Blockbuster, followed by a Blockbuster exclusive release at the end of August.

Cotten also wrote and produced another film in Arkansas, Resurrection County, with his company Dark Highway Films. The film is a neo-gothic horror about two couples who accidentally get off the trail in the wrong part of Arkansas and anger the wrong people. The story is loosely based on an actual encounter Cotten had with a group of anti-government semi-militia living just outside his hometown of Sallisaw. Resurrection County played through 2008–2009 in numerous festivals across the country.

In 2011, Cotten was an executive producer on the horror films The Devil's Carnival and Madison County, as well as acting in the latter.

In 2012, Cotten produced the horror/comedy film Hansel & Gretel Get Baked. The film stars Lara Flynn Boyle, Cary Elwes, Molly Quinn, and Michael Welch. A horror/comedy, the film takes the classic Hansel and Gretel story and adds the modern twist of the witch (Boyle) being a pot dealer in Pasadena. It was distributed through Tribeca Films. Cotten also acted as a second unit director on the film.

Cotten was also a partner in Local Hero, a post-production facility in Santa Monica, California. There he was a visual effects and digital intermediate producer on a number of films, including Pitch Perfect, Dope, Captain Fantastic, The Bad Batch, and many more. He also produced Local Hero's first feature film, I Remember You, directed by Claudia Sparrow in 2015.

In 2016, Cotten executive produced Alleluia: The Devil's Carnival 2, the follow-up to Darren Bousman's successful musical.

In 2017, Cotten wrote, produced and directed Painted Woman, through his company Dark Highway Films, partnering with Chasing Sunsets Productions. The film stars Stef Dawson, Matt Dallas, Robert Craighead, David Thomas Jenkins, and Kiowa Gordon. It played at the Bentonville Film Festival, which Geena Davis founded with sponsor Walmart to champion women and diversity in film. It also won Best Romance at the Alaska International Film Awards.
