= Bullet (2014 film) =

- Teaser poster
- Directed by: Nick Lyon
- Written by: Nick Lyon; Byron Lester; Ron Peer
- Produced by: Robert Rodriguez; Matthew Joynes
- Starring: Danny Trejo; Jonathan Banks
- Edited by: Julio Saldarriaga
- Music by: Ben Zarai
- Production companies: American United Entertainment; Funimation; SC Films International
- Distributed by: IFA Distribution; Funimation
- Release date: February 25, 2014
- Running time: 87 minutes
- Country: United States
- Language: English

Bullet (stylized as BULLET) is a 2014 action thriller film starring Danny Trejo as the title character and Jonathan Banks as the villain. The film was directed and co-written by Nick Lyon, with additional writing by Matthew Joynes, Ron Peer and Byron Lester, and was produced by Matthew Joynes and Robert Rodriguez. It follows an undercover police officer-turned-vigilante (Trejo) tracking down the crooks who kidnapped his grandson. Filming took place in Los Angeles, United States. The film was released on Blu-ray and DVD on February 25, 2014 in North America.

== Plot ==
Nearing retirement, maverick Los Angeles-based detective Frank "Bullet" Marasco is assigned to hunt down the notorious drug baron Carlito Kane, following a tipoff from Leroy, who is later whacked to death with a golf club due to interrupting Kane's golf game. Bullet and his team storm one of Kane's hideouts but fail to capture him.

The plot thickens when Governor Johnson's daughter is kidnapped by Kane along with her boyfriend, in a bid to save his son Manuel from execution via lethal injection. Kane streams the execution of the boyfriend on a phone to the Governor and says that his daughter is next if they don't stop the execution of his son. Thereafter, Bullet send his grandson Mario to a community park where Kane exacts revenge on Bullet by kidnapping his grandson. Eventually Bullet himself is abducted too, but only for a brief period of time, as he is able to escape. After a lengthy car chase, Bullet successfully evades Kane and his men but gets ambushed by them once again the next day.

Finally, Bullet calls it quits as a civil servant and resigns, secretly becoming a vigilante and goes to his cousin for weaponry to take Kane down. He proceeds to interrogate one of Kane's aides, killing her in her bathtub after she fails to fully cooperate. Panicking, Kane and his closest subordinates retreat to a desert where Bullet starts to kill Kane's henchmen one by one, including his grandson's four kidnappers. The final showdown between Kane and Bullet has the latter emerge as victor. Bullet reunites with his grandson and rescues Johnson's daughter. The victory is sweetened when Manuel Kane is publicly executed. Bullet, his daughter and his grandson savour the evening at the beach.

== Cast ==
- Danny Trejo as Frank "Bullet" Marasco
- Jonathan Banks as Carlito Kane
- Torsten Voges as Kruger
- Julia Dietze as Brooke Madison
- Max Perlich as Leroy
- Tinsel Korey as Vanessa
- John Savage as Governor Johnson
- Eve Mauro as Samantha
- Emilio Rivera as Speedy
- Eric St. John as Estes
- Chuck Hittinger as Kyle
- Isaac C. Singleton Jr. as Promoter
- Alison Ball as Attorney General
- Robert Blanche as Tarvis
- Eric Etebari as Manual Kane

== Production ==
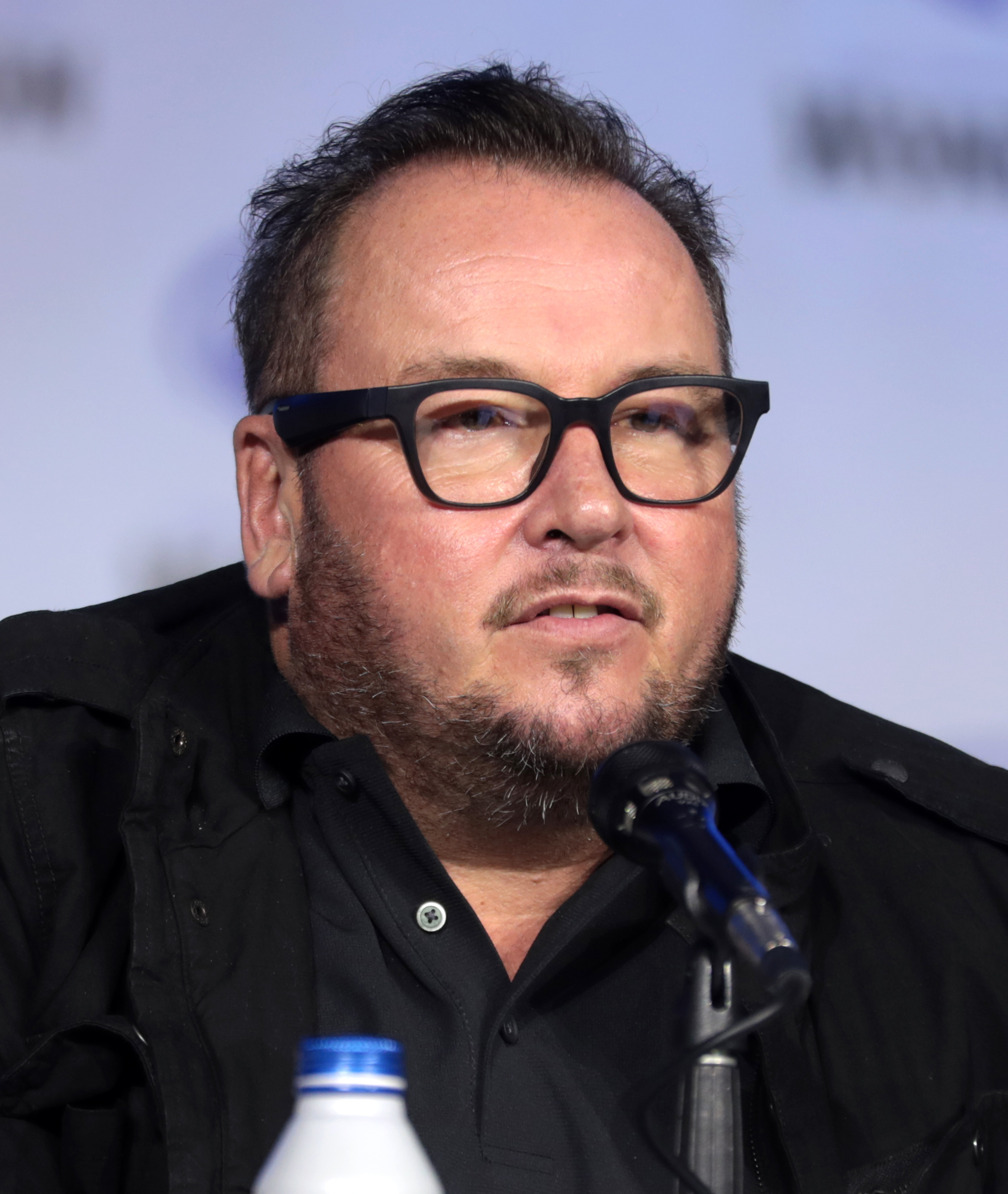
Director and co-writer Nick Lyon

Danny Trejo was cast as the title character, Frank "Bullet" Marasco. Jonathan Banks played the main antagonist of the film, drug cartel leader Carlito Kane. Bullet was directed by Nick Lyon, whilst the script was co-written by Lyon, Joynes Byron Lester, and Ron Peer. Robert Rodriguez and Matthew Joynes produced the film for American United Media, SC Films International, and Giant Ape Media. Carmen Cabana was the cinematographer. Filming commenced in early February 2013 and took place in Los Angeles.

== Release ==
The film was released in North America on February 25, 2014, and in the UK on March 7. There are two versions of Bullet: One edited by Funimation Entertainment, and the Director's Cut. Reportedly a superior version, the Director's Cut is being withheld from distribution.

== Reception ==
The film received generally negative reviews. On Rotten Tomatoes the film has an approval rating of 11% based on reviews from 9 critics.

Peter Bradshaw of The Guardian dubbed it as "terrible", "cheapo" and "lazy, rickety nonsense". He awarded it one star out of five.
