= The Line (2009 film) =

- Directed by: James Cotten
- Written by: R. Ellis Frazier
- Produced by: Geoffrey G. Ross; R. Ellis Frazier
- Starring: Ray Liotta; Andy García; Jordi Vilasuso; Esai Morales; Valerie Cruz; Bruce Davison; Kevin Gage; Danny Trejo; Gary Daniels; Joe Morton; Armand Assante
- Cinematography: Miguel Bunster
- Distributed by: IFA Distribution (US)
- Release date: May 14, 2009 (Little Rock Film Festival)
- Country: United States
- Languages: English; Spanish

The Line is a 2009 action-crime film directed by James Cotten with an ensemble cast that includes Ray Liotta, Armand Assante, Valerie Cruz, Esai Morales, and Andy García.

== Plot ==
Veteran assassin Mark Shields is hired to track down the head of an elusive drug cartel centered in Tijuana, Mexico. Shields takes the assignment in a weary daze, as he is fresh off a case that claimed the life of a woman he continues to see in his mind.

Meanwhile, Javier Salazar, the head of the cartel Shields is assigned to, is dying. Salazar hands over his position to his nephew, the cocky Pelon. Pelon takes charge with a different agenda, however, planning to change the cocaine being transported to heroin from Afghanistan.

Shields recruits Wire, an old friend, to help in an assassination attempt. Pelon is leaving one of his warehouses when he is attacked not only by Shields and Wire, but a different group set up by a contractor named Anthony. A shootout ensues, ending in Anthony's team being forced to withdraw. Shields aborts the operation, but Wire is kidnapped.

Pelon sees Padre Antonio after the shootout. Then he goes to talk to Salazar, who tells his nephew that their operation won't ever be in jeopardy if the Americans simply keep taking out the leaders. Salazar believes that someone will always be there to take the seat of the fallen leader.

Shields is mugged but is found by a local woman named Olivia, who takes him into her home. Shields stays until he recovers, then leaves. He later finds out that Wire was tortured and killed.

Pelon is attacked once more by Shields, and is kidnapped. Shields takes Pelon to Salazar's home. It is revealed that Salazar faked his illness, hired Shields and set up an elaborate twist for his nephew. Pelon is executed by Padre Antonio, another dupe set up by Salazar. Shields then gives his pay to Olivia (local woman) and boards a cab. On a ride to the airport Shields realizes that he was shot sometime when he was kidnapping Pelon, and he slowly lays down in the back of the cab and dies.

== Cast ==
- Andy García as Javier Salazar
- Ray Liotta as Mark Shields
- Esai Morales as René Pelon
- Jordi Vilasuso as Diablo
- Kevin Gage as "Wire"
- Danny Trejo as Mario
- Armand Assante as Padre Antonio
- Valerie Cruz as Olivia
- Bruce Davison as Anthony

== Reception ==
Variety's reviewer called it a "confused and confusing shoot-’em-up saga", and criticised the various plotlines which "never truly tie up, although a nifty final twist nearly conjures the illusion of clarity in hindsight."
