= Back to the Sea =

- Directed by: Thom Lu
- Written by: Thom Lu; James D. Mortellaro; Calvin Yao
- Produced by: Calvin Yao
- Starring: Yuri Lowenthal; Kath Soucie; Tom Kenny; Mark Hamill; Tim Curry; Christian Slater
- Cinematography: Ono Yao
- Edited by: Thom Lu
- Music by: Gordon McGhie
- Production companies: Glory & Dream Entertainment; IndustryWorks Pictures; Jiangsu Broadcasting Corporation; China Television Artists Association; Nanjing University of Finance and Economics; Nanjing Film and Television Animation Training Base
- Distributed by: Viva Pictures (United States); Yinrun Pictures (China)
- Release dates: January 27, 2012 (Canada); November 16, 2012 (United States); December 30, 2012 (China)
- Running time: 97 minutes
- Countries: China; United States
- Languages: Mandarin; English

Back to the Sea (simplified Chinese: 重返大海; traditional Chinese: 返回大海; pinyin: Chóng fǎn dàhǎi) is a 2012 3D traditional animated comedy film written and directed by Thom Lu. It was released on January 27, 2012, in Canada and November 16, 2012, in the United States.

== Plot ==
Kevin the flying fish and his family and friends live a happy and carefree life in the depths of the Atlantic Ocean. But Kevin has a cherished dream - to get to Barbados, to the flying fish kingdom. His thirst for adventures leads him to the Rock of Fame, where a family treasure - a huge pearl, is hidden. Kevin gets captured by fishers and then finds himself in an aquarium of a popular Chinese restaurant. It seems that his fate is decided, but suddenly a small boy comes to the aid of Kevin.

== Voice cast ==
- Yuri Lowenthal as Kevin, a blue and orange flying fish, the main protagonist
- Kath Soucie as Shaobao, a young Chinese American boy who wants to free Kevin from the aquarium
- Tom Kenny as Ben, a green surgeonfish
- Mark Hamill as Bunker an octopus sushiman
- Matthew Yang King as Dabao, Shaobao's father
- Tim Curry as Eric, a flying fish who is Kevin's father
- Christian Slater as Jack, a villainous detective who is responsible for transporting stolen goods
- Tara Strong as Sammy, a female yellow and black canary rockfish
- James Sie as Cook Liu, a man who works as a Chef in the Chinese restaurant
- Sam Riegel as Short Seagull
- Fred Tatasciore as Fat Seagull
- Ali Hillis as Teaching Fish, an orange, yellow and black angelfish who acts as a teacher in the aquarium
- Chris Edgerly as Clean Fish, a French-accented remora
- John DiMaggio as Boss
- Annie Mumolo as Danny
- Nolan North as Farley, a flying fish
- Kate Higgins as Little Fish
- Ogie Banks as Richard, a teal-colored mackerel
- Gwendoline Yeo as Waitress
- Hynden Walch as Tiny Fish
- Justin Cowden as Marvin, a shrimp
- Andrew Dolan as Pat Down Cop

== Release ==
This film was released in theaters in Canada in 3D and regular "2D" formats on January 27, 2012. It got a limited release in the United States on November 16, 2012, distributed by Viva Pictures and then in China by Yinrun Pictures on December 30, 2012.

== Reception ==
Barbara Shulgasser-Parker from Common Sense Media rated the film two stars out of five, saying "Bland fish tale is a Finding Nemo wannabe."

== Music ==
The film's score is composed by Gordon McGhie. This film features the popular song What a Wonderful World from Louis Armstrong.
