= Daniel P. Coughlin (author) =

American screenwriter

- Born: United States
- Occupation(s): Author, screenwriter

Daniel P. Coughlin is an American film and fiction writer.

== Early life ==
After a stint in the United States Marine Corps infantry, where he served as a machine-gunner stationed at Camp Pendleton, California and served in Operation Desert Fox, he earned a degree in Film and Television from California State University, Long Beach.

== Career ==
Coughlin has written three feature films: Lake Dead, Farm House, and Ditch Day Massacre. He has two published novels Ted's Score and The Last Custome. His latest work, Craven's Red, was released September 11, 2013.
