= Inbal B. Lessner =

Israeli-American producer and film editor

- ענבל לסנר
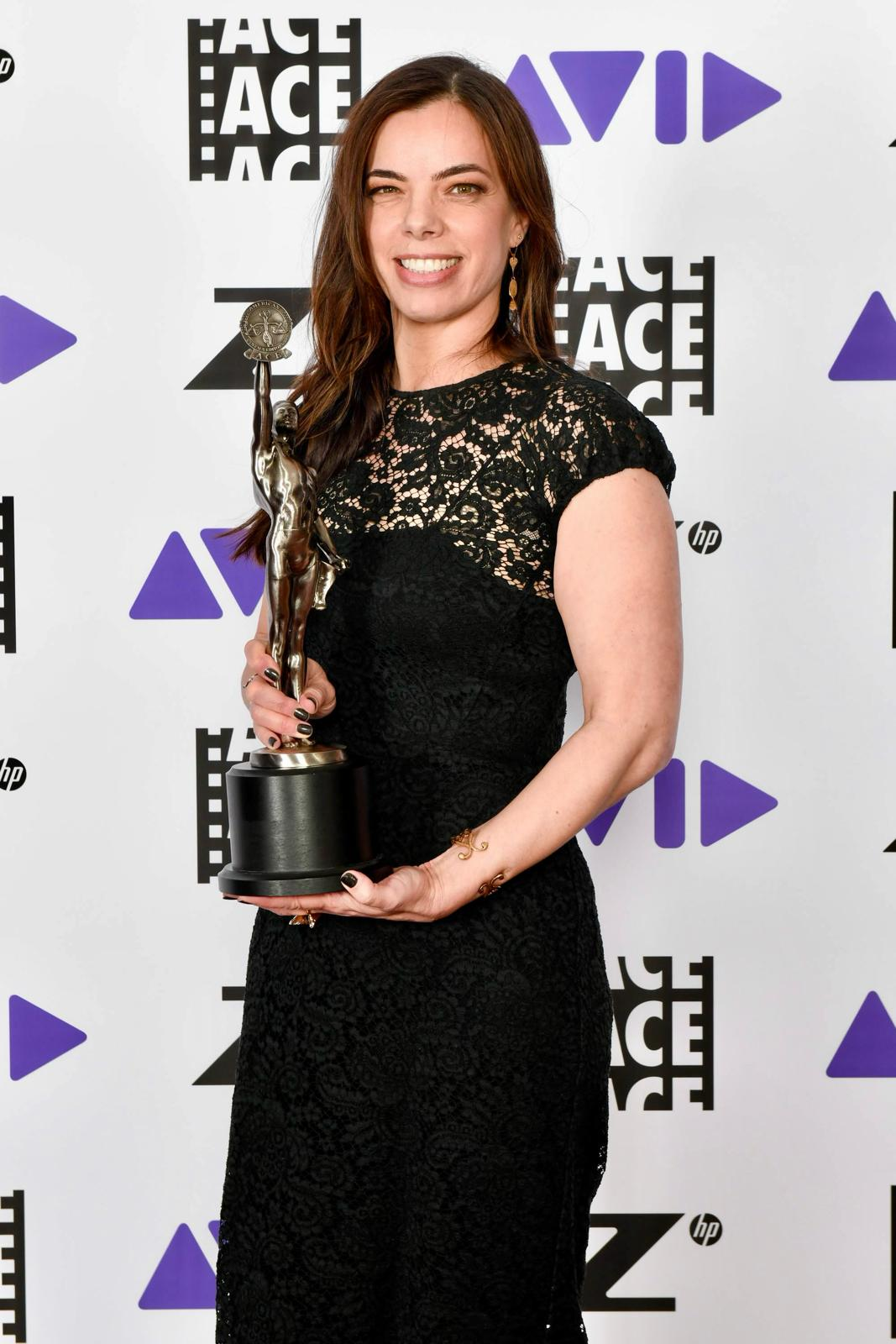
- Occupations: Editor, producer
- Years active: 2003-present

Inbal B. Lessner (Hebrew: ענבל לסנר) is a producer and film editor. She has served as producer and editor on Brave Miss World (2013), Seduced: Inside the NXIVM Cult (2020), and Escaping Twin Flames (2023).

Lessner has been nominated for a Primetime Emmy Award for Exceptional Merit in Documentary Filmmaking and twice nominated for an American Cinema Editors Award for Best Edited Documentary – (Non-Theatrical). In 2024, Lessner was awarded the American Cinema Editors Award for Best Edited Documentary – (Non-Theatrical).

== Early life ==
Lessner was born in Israel, where she began editing in high school. Lessner served in the Israel Defense Forces, where she produced training films. She attended New York University Tisch School of the Arts.

== Career ==
Frequently collaborating with Cecilia Peck, Lessner has served as producer and editor on Brave Miss World a documentary revolving around Linor Abargil spreading awareness around sexual assault following her own. The film was distributed by Netflix and was nominated for a Primetime Emmy Award for Exceptional Merit in Documentary Filmmaking. She also served as producer, editor and writer on Seduced: Inside the NXIVM Cult which explores the NXIVM cult through the perspective of India Oxenberg for Starz. The series earned Lessner a nomination for American Cinema Editors Award for Best Edited Documentary – (Non-Theatrical).

Lessner also produced and edited Escaping Twin Flames a Netflix series which explores and critiques the Twin Flames Universe. The series earned Lessner the 2024 American Cinema Editors Award for Best Edited Documentary – (Non-Theatrical).

Lessner has additionally served as editor on The Seventies, The Eighties, The Nineties and The 2000s for CNN, earning a nomination for American Cinema Editors Award for Best Edited Documentary – (Non-Theatrical) for her work on The Nineties, Victim/Suspect, and Stormy.

Lessner served as co-editor on the 2025 film October H8TE – The Fight for the Soul of America. The film covers 2024 pro-Palestinian protests on university campuses after the October 7 attacks. Co-produced by Wendy Sachs and Debra Messing, the film includes interviews with Michael Rapaport, Noa Tishby, U.S. Representative Ritchie Torres, U.S. Sen. Kirsten Gillibrand, Sheryl Sandberg, Dan Senor, Scott Galloway, and Mosab Yousef. It explores the organization of Students for Justice in Palestine, and argues that SJP promoted anti-Zionism, and ultimately antisemitism on campus. The film also covers the role of social media in stoking antisemitism among young people.

== Personal life ==
Lessner resides in Los Angeles, California alongside her children.
