= Twin Flame (disambiguation) =

Twin flames, in spirituality, is a belief that two individuals share a single soul essence between two bodies.

Twin Flame(s) may also refer to:

== Music ==
- Twin Flames (band), a Canadian folk duo active since 2015

=== Songs ===
- "Twin Flames" (song), by Klaxons, 2010
- "Twin Flame", a 2026 song by Ari Lennox
- "Twin Flames", a song by Epica from the 2012 album Requiem for the Indifferent
- "Twin Flames", a song by In This Moment from the 2017 album Ritual
- "Twin Flame", a 2022 song by Kaytranada and Anderson .Paak
- "Twin Flame", a song by Machine Gun Kelly from the 2022 album Mainstream Sellout
- "Twin Flame", a song by Weyes Blood from the 2022 album And in the Darkness, Hearts Aglow

== Other uses ==
- Twin Flames Universe, an American cult founded in 2017
  - Escaping Twin Flames, a Netflix documentary about the cult
  - Desperately Seeking Soulmate: Escaping Twin Flames Universe, an Amazon Prime documentary about the cult
- Soulmates
