= The Portrait (1993 film) =

- Genre: Drama
- Based on: Painting Churches by Tina Howe
- Screenplay by: Lynn Roth
- Directed by: Arthur Penn
- Starring: Gregory Peck; Lauren Bacall; Cecilia Peck
- Music by: Cynthia Millar
- Country of origin: United States
- Original language: English

Production
- Executive producers: Robert Greenwald; Gregory Peck; Carla Singer
- Producers: Philip K. Kleinbart; Scott U. Adam; Linda Berman; David Haugland; Richard Schmiechen
- Production location: Raleigh, North Carolina
- Cinematography: Richard Quinlan
- Editor: Janet Bartels-Vandagriff
- Running time: 90 minutes
- Production company: Turner Pictures

Original release
- Network: TNT
- Release: February 13, 1993

The Portrait is a 1993 American made-for-television drama film adapted from the play Painting Churches, directed by Arthur Penn, and starring Gregory Peck and Lauren Bacall. Cecilia Peck, who plays the daughter in the film, is the real-life daughter of actor Gregory Peck and his second wife Veronique Peck. The film was broadcast on TNT on February 13, 1993.

== Plot ==
Artist Margaret Church returns to her parents home to create a portrait of them. Margaret is shocked to discover that her parents have decided to sell their home, and she has trouble accepting the loss of her childhood home. Margaret finishes her portrait, only to believe that her parents dislike it. Eventually she realizes that her parents do not dislike her portrait, and Margaret becomes closer to them once more.

== Cast ==
- Gregory Peck as Gardner Church
- Lauren Bacall as Fanny Church
- Cecilia Peck as Margaret Church
- Paul McCrane as Bartel
- Donna Mitchell as Marissa Pindar
- Joyce O'Connor as Samantha Button
- Mitchell Laurance as Ted Button
- William Prince as Hubert Hayden
- Richard K. Olsen as Doctor
