= Overexposed (disambiguation) =

Overexposed is excess amount of light captured by a camera.

Overexposed may also refer to:

- Overexposed (album), the 2012 album by Maroon 5
  - Overexposed Tour, the related concert tour
- Overexposed (film), the 1990 film
