= Alexandra Milchan =

French-American film and TV producer

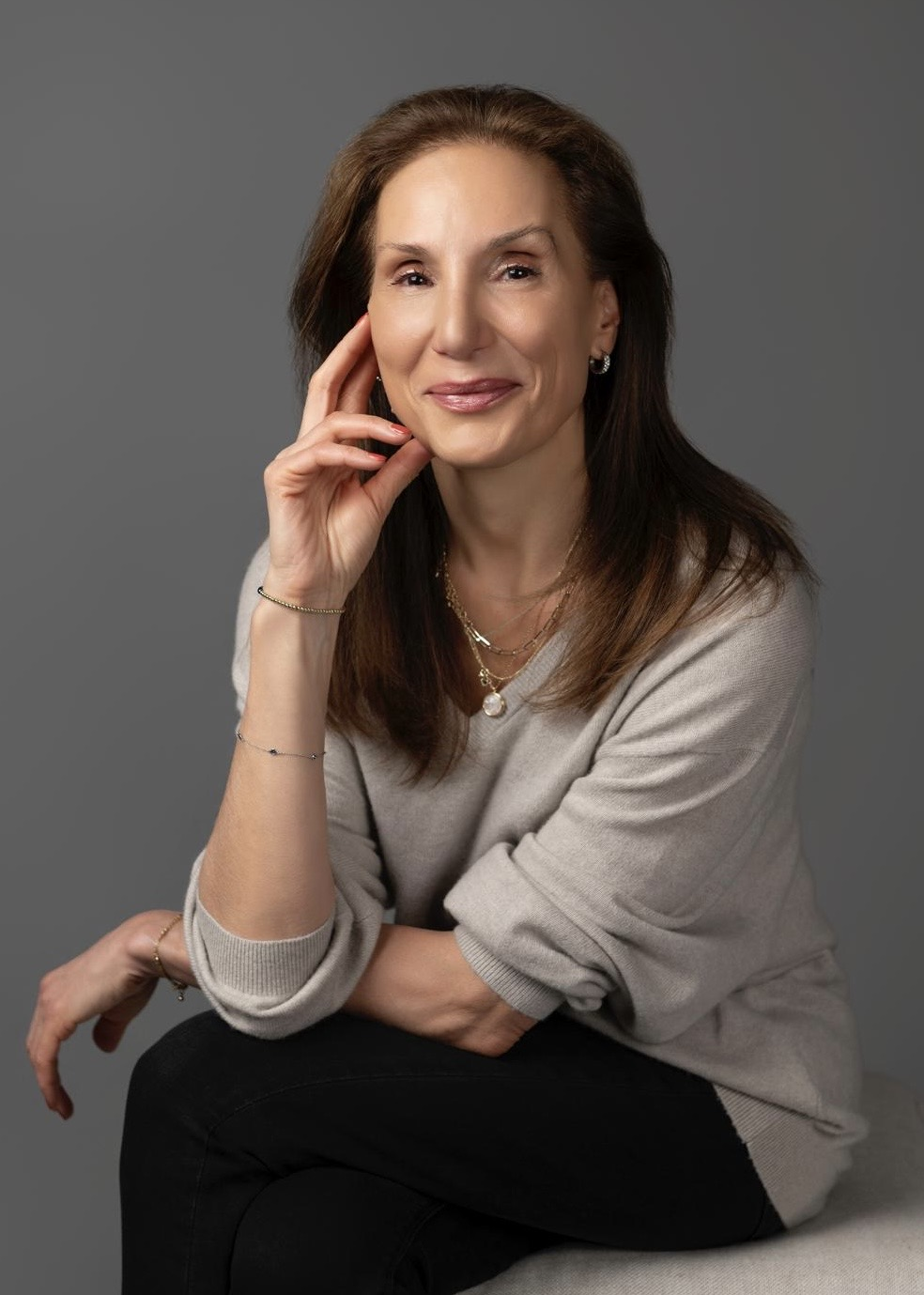
- Born: 28 July 1972 (age 54)
- Other name: Alexandra Milchan-Lambert
- Education: Emerson College
- Occupations: Television & film producer
- Parent: Arnon Milchan

Alexandra Milchan (born 28 July 1972) is a French-American film and television producer based in Los Angeles and New York.

She has earned Academy Award and Golden Globe nominations for her work, which includes Todd Field's Tár starring Cate Blanchett, which received six Academy Award nominations; Apple TV+'s Golden Globe- and Emmy-winning crime drama Black Bird, starring Taron Egerton and Paul Walter Hauser; and The Wolf of Wall Street, which earned 5 nominations at the 86th Academy Awards.

Milchan is an executive producer of AMC's anthology series The Terror, with a fourth season currently in development; the Apple TV+ limited series The Crowded Room starring Tom Holland, Amanda Seyfried, and Emmy Rossum, as well as the Netflix crime thriller The Killer directed by David Fincher and starring Michael Fassbender.

Her upcoming credits include Safe Houses, an international spy thriller for Apple starring Jennifer Connelly and Ana de Armas; the Netflix series Calabasas which she is producing alongside Emma Roberts, Kim Kardashian, and showrunner Chris Van Dusen; the Peacock series Bride Wars, which she is producing with Emma Roberts and writer Sascha Rothchild; and the horror thriller Crawlers, which she produced with Basil Iwanyk.

Notable past credits include The 24th, co-written and directed by Oscar-winner Kevin Willmott, the Starz docuseries Seduced: Inside the NXIVM Cult, the Freida Pinto-led Netflix thriller Intrusion, David Ayer's Street Kings, Alexandre Aja's horror thriller Mirrors, and the Netflix features The Red Sea Diving Resort and The Silence.

Milchan previously ran EMJAG Productions and is now the head of Crescent Line Productions, Inc. In 2007, Variety named her one of its Top 10 Producers to Watch.

== Biography ==
Milchan grew up in Paris. She is the daughter of Arnon Milchan, the founder of Regency Enterprises, and Brigitte Jeanmaire, a French model. She attended Emerson College, graduating with a Bachelor of Arts degree in 1994. Milchan then relocated to Los Angeles to work in the entertainment industry.

Milchan began her film career in 1993 as an assistant at her father, Arnon Milchan's company New Regency, eventually working her way up to senior roles. Arnon Milchan named his daughter vice president in 2000. She left the company in the mid 2000s, but returned as Executive VP of production in 2011. During her 17-year stint at New Regency, Milchan was involved with films such as Heat, A Time to Kill, and L.A. Confidential.

In 2013, Milchan received her executive producer credit for The Wolf of Wall Street, but only after filing a lawsuit against the main financing company for the film regarding producer credits and fees.

Milchan ran and oversaw the development and production of all of Emjag's projects, and is now the head of Crescent Line Productions, Inc.

She has three children.

== Film and television ==
=== Executive producer ===
Year	Title	Director	Notes
2010	Mirrors 2	Victor Garcia	executive producer (as Alexandra Milchan-Lambert)
2013	The Wolf of Wall Street	Martin Scorsese	
2018	The Terror		TV Anthology Series
2019	The Terror: Infamy		TV Anthology Series
2020	Seduced: Inside the NXIVM Cult	Cecilia Peck	TV miniseries
2022	Black Bird	Michaël R. Roskam; Jim McKay; Joe Chappelle	TV miniseries
2023	The Crowded Room	Kornél Mundruczó	TV series
2023	The Killer	David Fincher	
2023	Escaping Twin Flames	Cecilia Peck	TV miniseries
2026	The Terror: Devil in Silver		TV Anthology Series
TBA	Safe Houses		TV series
TBA	Calabasas		TV series
TBA	Bride Wars		TV series

=== Producer ===
Year	Title	Director	Notes
1998	Goodbye Lover	Roland Joffé	
2007	Chapter 27	Jarrett Schaefer	
2008	The Last Word	Geoffrey Haley	
2008	Street Kings	David Ayer	
2008	Mirrors	Alexandre Aja	
2008	Righteous Kill	Jon Avnet	
2009	The Esseker File	Alexandre Aja	Video
2009	Circle of Eight	Stephen Cragg	
2012	Bullet to the Head	Walter Hill	
2013	Paranoia	Robert Luketic	
2015	Naomi and Ely's No Kiss List	Kristin Hanggi	
2019	The Silence	John R. Leonetti	
2019	The Red Sea Diving Resort	Gideon Raff	
2019	Mary	Michael Goi	
2020	The 24th	Kevin Willmott	
2021	Intrusion	Adam Salky	
2022	Tár	Todd Field	Produced by Todd Field, Alexandra Milchan & Scott Lambert
2023	The Absence of Eden	Marco Perego	
2026	Crawlers	Angel Gómez Hernández	
