= A Conversation with Gregory Peck =

- Directed by: Barbara Kopple
- Produced by: Barbara Kopple; Cecilia Peck; Linda Saffire
- Starring: Gregory Peck
- Cinematography: Tom Hurwitz; Don Lenzer; Sandi Sissel
- Edited by: Bob Eisenhardt
- Music by: Art Labriola
- Release date: October 14, 1999 (Chicago)
- Running time: 97 minutes
- Country: United States
- Language: English

A Conversation with Gregory Peck is a 1999 American documentary film directed by Barbara Kopple.

Kopple followed Peck as he embarked on a live speaking tour throughout the United States reflecting on his life and career. The film also looks at Peck's home life with his family, as well as his public appearances where he meets such notable individuals as then President of the United States Bill Clinton, then French President Jacques Chirac, and filmmaker Martin Scorsese.

A Conversation with Gregory Peck was part of the PBS documentary series American Masters and was screened out of competition at the 2000 Cannes Film Festival. It is featured on a 2005 2-disc collector's edition of To Kill a Mockingbird.

== Cast ==
- Gregory Peck
- Lauren Bacall
- Mary Badham
- Jacques Chirac
- Bill Clinton
- Hillary Clinton
- Martin Scorsese
- Veronique Passani
- Anthony Peck
- Carey Paul Peck
- Cecilia Peck
- Don Peck
- Steve Peck
- Zack Peck
- Daniel Voll
