= Catherine Oxenberg =

American actress (born 1961)

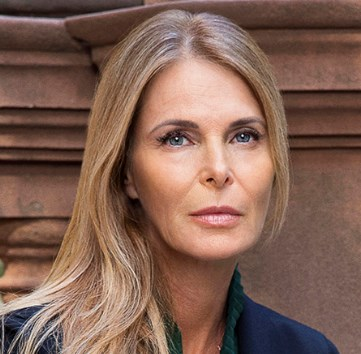
- Oxenberg in 2020
- Born: September 22, 1961 (age 64); New York City, New York, U.S.
- Education: Lycée Français Charles de Gaulle; St. Paul's School; Columbia University (dropped out)
- Occupation: Actress
- Years active: 1982–present
- Known for: Dynasty; The Royal Romance of Charles and Diana; Charles and Diana: Unhappily Ever After; Acapulco H.E.A.T. The Lair of the White Worm
- Spouses: Robert Evans (m. 1998; annul. 1998); Casper Van Dien (m. 1999; div. 2015); Ellis Jones (m. 2023)
- Children: 3, including India Oxenberg
- Mother: Princess Elizabeth of Yugoslavia
- Relatives: Christina Oxenberg (sister)

Catherine Oxenberg (born September 22, 1961) is an American actress. She is best known for her role as Amanda Carrington on the 1980s prime time soap opera Dynasty. Oxenberg is the daughter of Princess Elizabeth of Yugoslavia and her first husband, Howard Oxenberg (1919–2010). She twice played Diana, Princess of Wales on screen, in The Royal Romance of Charles and Diana (1982) and Charles and Diana: Unhappily Ever After (1992), and has appeared in many other films.

== Early life and education ==
Oxenberg was born in New York City, and grew up in London. She is the eldest daughter of Princess Elizabeth of Yugoslavia (born 1936), a member of the House of Karađorđević, and her first husband Howard Oxenberg (1919–2010), a Jewish self-made textile and clothing tycoon and close friend of the Kennedy family. Her sister is Christina Oxenberg. Princess Elizabeth is the only daughter of Prince Paul of Yugoslavia (who served as regent for his cousin's eldest son King Peter II of Yugoslavia) and Princess Olga of Greece and Denmark.

Through her maternal grandmother, Catherine is a first cousin once removed of: Prince Edward, Duke of Kent, Princess Alexandra, The Honourable Lady Ogilvy and Prince Michael of Kent. Oxenberg is a second cousin once removed of Queen Sofía of Spain and Charles III of the United Kingdom, making Catherine a third cousin of Felipe VI of Spain and William, Prince of Wales. She is also a third cousin once removed of Margrethe II of Denmark and Harald V of Norway; and a fourth cousin to Grand Duke Henri of Luxembourg and King Philippe of Belgium.

Oxenberg was educated at the Lycée Français Charles de Gaulle in Kensington, London, St. Paul's School, and Columbia University, though she did not finish college. She had initially enrolled at Harvard University as a member of the Class of 1985.

== Ancestry ==
Through her maternal grandfather, Prince Paul of Yugoslavia of the House of Karađorđević, Catherine Oxenberg is a great-great-great-granddaughter of Karađorđe, who started the First Serbian Uprising against the Ottoman Empire in 1804. Her maternal grandmother, Princess Olga, was the daughter of Grand Duchess Elena Vladimirovna of Russia and Prince Nicholas of Greece and Denmark, himself the son of another Romanov grand duchess, Queen Olga Konstantinovna of the Hellenes and her Danish-born husband King George of Greece, brother of Queen Alexandra of the United Kingdom and the Empress Maria Fyodorovna.

Ancestors of Catherine Oxenberg

8. Israel Oxenberg
4. Jakob Oxenberg
9. Pearl Borveck
2. Howard Oxenberg
10. Bernard Friedman
5. Daisy Friedman
11. Hannah Monthem
1. Catherine Oxenberg
12. Prince Arsen of Yugoslavia
6. Paul, Prince Regent of Yugoslavia
13. Princess Aurora Pavlovna Demidova of San Donato
3. Princess Elizabeth of Yugoslavia
14. Prince Nicholas of Greece and Denmark
7. Princess Olga of Greece and Denmark
15. Grand Duchess Elena Vladimirovna of Russia

== Career ==
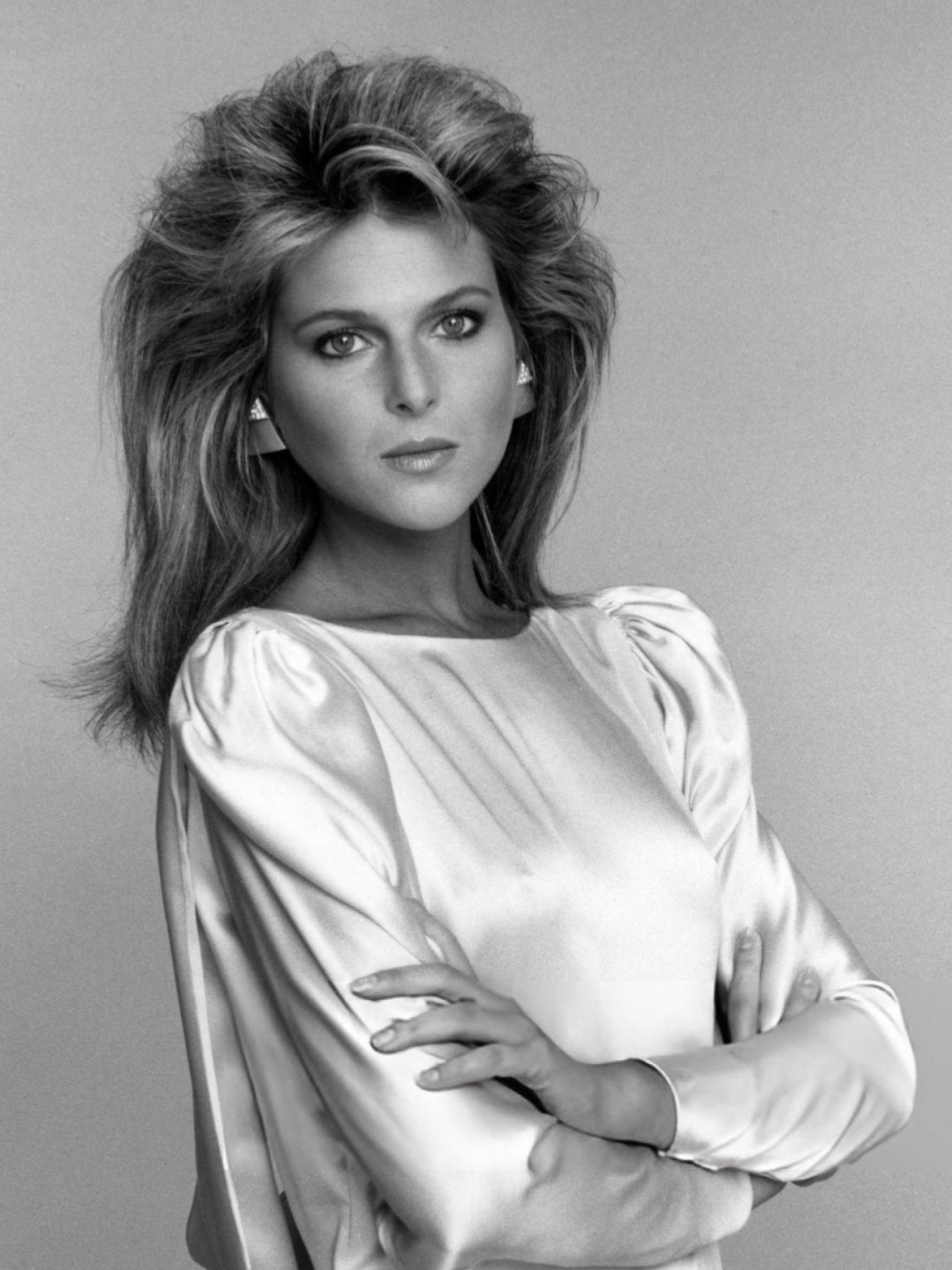
Oxenberg in Dynasty, 1984

Oxenberg made her acting debut in the 1982 made-for-television film The Royal Romance of Charles and Diana, in which she played Diana, Princess of Wales. In 1984, Oxenberg joined the hit ABC prime time soap opera Dynasty—then at its height of popularity—in the role of Amanda Carrington. Oxenberg left Dynasty in 1986, following a salary dispute after the end of her second season, and the role was recast with Karen Cellini. Though Oxenberg's publicist insisted that the actress left Dynasty voluntarily, several media outlets reported that she was fired.

Oxenberg was the guest host on the May 10, 1986, episode of Saturday Night Live, making her the only descendant of a royal family to host the show. Oxenberg starred as Princess Elysa in the 1987 television film Roman Holiday. She also appeared in The Lair of the White Worm in 1988, and reprised the role of Diana, Princess of Wales in the TV film Charles and Diana: Unhappily Ever After in 1992. From 1993 to 1994, she starred in the short-lived series Acapulco H.E.A.T.

Oxenberg was portrayed by Rachael Taylor in the 2005 telemovie Dynasty: The Making of a Guilty Pleasure, a fictionalized retelling of the behind-the-scenes goings-on during the production of Dynasty. In 2006, Oxenberg appeared in the TV special, Dynasty Reunion: Catfights & Caviar, in which she was reunited with her former Dynasty castmates to reminisce about the series.

In 2019, Catherine Oxenberg produced and narrated Escaping the NXIVM Cult: A Mother's Fight to Save Her Daughter in which Andrea Roth portrayed her.

== Personal life ==
In June 1991, Oxenberg had a daughter, India Riven Oxenberg, whose father was later revealed to be the convicted drug smuggler William Weitz Shaffer. In December 1992, Oxenberg was living with her daughter in Coldwater Canyon, Los Angeles, California.

Oxenberg's first marriage was to the producer Robert Evans, in Beverly Hills, California, on July 12, 1998, but the marriage was annulled nine days later.

Oxenberg met the actor Casper Van Dien during the filming of the 1999 TV movie The Collectors, and they worked together again the same year in the Evangelical Christian thriller The Omega Code. On May 8, 1999, they were married at the Graceland Wedding Chapel in Las Vegas, Nevada. While Van Dien had a son and a daughter from a previous marriage, Oxenberg and Van Dien have two daughters together. In 2005, the couple appeared in their own reality series, I Married a Princess, which aired on the Lifetime Television channel in the United States and on LIVINGtv in the United Kingdom. Van Dien filed for divorce from Oxenberg in 2015.

While Oxenberg and Van Dien were married, and before India joined the cult known as NXIVM, Oxenberg and Van Dien were celebrity ambassadors for the non-profit organization Childhelp.

In June 2023, Oxenberg revealed her engagement to businessman Ellis Jones. They began dating shortly after Jones offered Oxenberg a place to stay following her losing her home in the 2018 California wildfires. The couple married on October 21, 2023.

=== NXIVM ===
Oxenberg acknowledged in November 2017 that she had had interactions with Keith Raniere and his NXIVM organization, bringing her daughter India into NXIVM in 2011 for what she thought would be "a self-help, business-oriented program." Oxenberg confirmed that her daughter became heavily involved in the cult and that she had initiated what proved to be a failed intervention for India.

In August 2018, Oxenberg revealed that India had left NXIVM in June, after the arrest of Raniere, and they were working on their relationship. In August 2018, Oxenberg's book Captive: A Mother's Crusade to Save Her Daughter from a Terrifying Cult co-written by former People magazine writer Natasha Stoynoff was published.

In 2020, Oxenberg was featured in The Vow, a documentary series for HBO, directed by Jehane Noujaim and Karim Amer, which follows Oxenberg's attempts to rescue her daughter India. Oxenberg also appears in Seduced: Inside the NXIVM Cult a documentary series for Starz, directed by Cecilia Peck and Inbal B. Lessner, which features India speaking out about her experiences for the first time.

== Filmography ==
=== Film ===
Year	Title	Role	Notes
1988	The Lair of the White Worm	Eve Trent	
1990	Overexposed	Kristin	
1999	The Omega Code	Cassandra Barashe	
1999	Arthur's Quest	Morgana	
2000	Sanctimony	Susan Renart	
2008	Starship Troopers 3: Marauder	Tech 2	Uncredited
2014	Sleeping Beauty	Queen Violet	
2020	Acquitted by Faith	Beth Stills	

=== Television ===
Year	Title	Role	Notes
1982	The Royal Romance of Charles and Diana	Lady Diana Spencer	TV movie
1984	Cover Up	Michelle Lloyd	Episode: "Pilot"
1984	The Love Boat	Monika Blackbird	2 episodes
1984–1986	Dynasty	Amanda Carrington	54 episodes
1986	The Love Boat	Carrie Barton	2 episodes
1987	Still Crazy Like a Fox	Nancy	TV movie
1987	Roman Holiday	Princess Elysa	TV movie
1989	Swimsuit	Jade Greene	TV movie
1989	Trenchcoat in Paradise	Lisa Duncan	TV movie
1990	Bony	Angela Hemmings	TV movie
1991	Ring of Scorpio	Fiona Matthews McDonald	TV movie
1991	K-9000	Aja Turner	TV movie
1992	Sexual Response	Kate	TV movie
1992	Charles and Diana: Unhappily Ever After	Diana, Princess of Wales	TV movie
1993	Rubdown	Jordy	TV movie
1993–1994	Acapulco H.E.A.T.	Ashley Hunter-Coddington	22 episodes
1994	Treacherous Beauties	Simone Hollister	TV movie
1995	The Nanny	Sydney Mercer	Episode: "Oy Vey, You're Gay"
1998	Catch Me If You Can	Tina Walcott	TV movie
1999	Boys Will Be Boys	Patsy Parker	TV movie
1999	Arthur's Quest	Morgana	TV movie
1999	Time Served	Sarah McKinney	TV movie
1999	The Collectors	Det Bailey	TV movie
1999	Thrill Seekers	Thrill Seekers Spokesperson	TV movie
2000	Road Rage	Forest Service Woman	TV movie
2000	Baywatch	Erika	Episode: "Bad Boyz"
2001	Flying Dutchman	Lacy Anderson	TV movie
2001	The Miracle of the Cards	Marion Shergold	TV movie
2002	Perilous	Sasha	TV movie
2002	The Vector File	Margaret	TV movie
2005	Starship Troopers	Female pilot (voice)	Video game
2005	Premonition	Kate Barnes	TV movie
2005	Out of Practice	Claudia Penchant	Episode: "Brothers Grim"
2006–2007	Watch Over Me	Leandra Thames	64 episodes
2010	The Dog Who Saved Christmas Vacation	Dottie McGovern	TV movie
2015	Sharktopus vs. Whalewolf	Reinhardt	TV movie
2019	Escaping the NXIVM Cult: A Mother's Fight to Save Her Daughter	Herself/narrator	TV film; Also executive producer
2019	E! True Hollywood Story	Herself	Episode: "NXIVM: Self Help or Sex Cult?"
2020	The Vow	Herself	7 episodes
2020	Seduced: Inside the NXIVM Cult	Herself	4 episodes

== Accolades ==
For playing Amanda Carrington, Oxenberg won two Soap Opera Digest Awards in 1985, for Outstanding Supporting Actress and Outstanding Female Newcomer.
