= Escaping Twin Flames =

2023 American documentary miniseries

- Genre: Documentary
- Directed by: Cecilia Peck
- Music by: Daniel Lessner
- Country of origin: United States
- Original language: English
- No. of episodes: 3

Production
- Executive producers: Cecilia Peck; Inbal B. Lessner; Daniel Voll; Alexandra Milchan; Jordana Hochman; Alison Dammann
- Cinematography: Matthew Chavez
- Editors: Mimi Wilcox; Inbal B. Lessner; Troy Takaki; Kevin Hibbard; Martin Biehn
- Running time: 57-58 minutes
- Production company: Good Caper Content

Original release
- Network: Netflix
- Release: November 8, 2023

Escaping Twin Flames is an American true crime television documentary series, directed by Cecilia Peck. It explores the world of Twin Flames Universe, a cult run by Shaleia and Jeff Divine.

It was released on November 8, 2023, on Netflix.

== Premise ==
The series explores the world of Twin Flames Universe, a cult run by Shaleia and Jeff Divine, featuring interviews with former members, exploring allegations of coercive control, indoctrination and abuse.

== Episodes ==
No.	Title	Directed by	Original release date
1	"Smoke & Mirrors"	Cecilia Peck	November 8, 2023
2	"Playing With Fire"	Cecilia Peck	November 8, 2023
3	"Up in Flames"	Cecilia Peck	November 8, 2023

== Production ==
Following the release of Seduced: Inside the NXIVM Cult, Cecilia Peck and Inbal B. Lessner were flooded with messages regarding other cults and control groups, with Peck and Lessner urged to expose Twin Flames Universe. The filmmakers reached out to Shaleia and Jeff Divine for comment, who declined. Former members sent Peck and Lessner footage of classes, documents, and photos, and a hard drive which included the most incriminating material.

== Reception ==
=== Critical reception ===
On the review aggregator website Rotten Tomatoes, 100% of 5 critics' reviews are positive.

== See also ==
- Desperately Seeking Soulmate: Escaping Twin Flames Universe, another 2023 documentary on Twin Flames Universe
