= Thomas Brodie-Sangster =

British actor (born 1990)

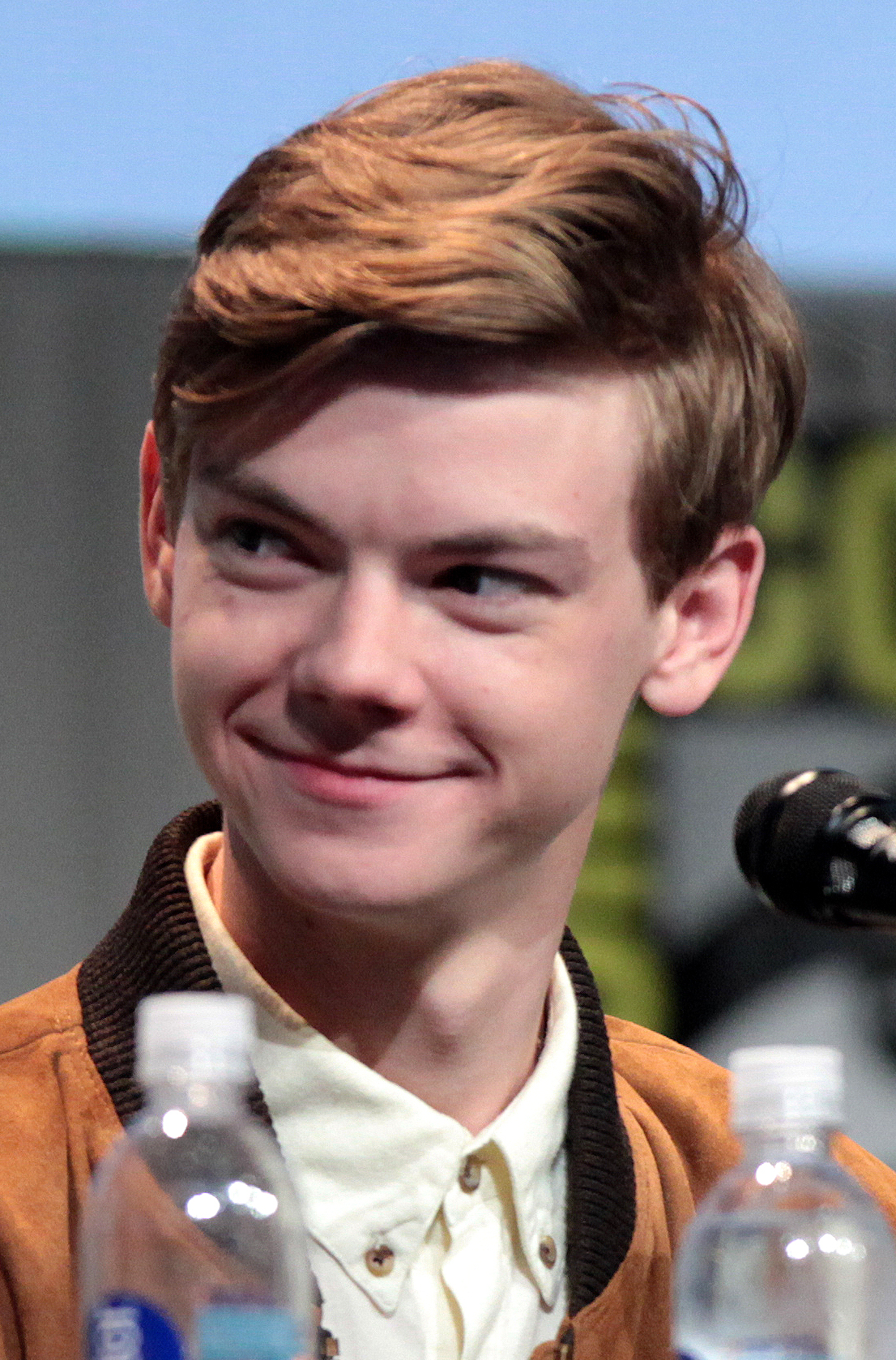
- Brodie-Sangster in 2015
- Born: 16 May 1990 (age 36); London, England
- Other name: Thomas Sangster
- Occupation: Actor
- Years active: 2001–present
- Spouse: Talulah Riley (m. 2024)

Thomas Brodie-Sangster (born 16 May 1990) is a British actor. As a child actor, he gained recognition for his roles in the films Love Actually (2003) and Nanny McPhee (2005). He voiced Ferb in the first four seasons of Phineas and Ferb (2007–2015) and subsequently gained wider attention with his roles as Jake Murray in Accused (2010–2012), Jojen Reed in Game of Thrones (2013–2014) and as Newt in the Maze Runner film series (2014–2018). Continued acclaim ensued with the independent films Nowhere Boy (2009), in which he portrayed Paul McCartney; Bright Star (2009); and Death of a Superhero (2011).

Sangster has received praise for his roles in the miniseries Godless (2017) and The Queen's Gambit (2020); his performance as chess champion Benny Watts in The Queen's Gambit earned him a nomination for the Primetime Emmy Award for Outstanding Supporting Actor in a Limited or Anthology Series or Movie. He has since portrayed the titular pickpocket in the historical crime drama series The Artful Dodger (2023–present) and Rafe Sadler in the series sequel Wolf Hall: The Mirror and the Light (2024), reprising his earlier role from the first Wolf Hall (2015) series.

== Early life ==
Sangster was born on 16 May 1990 in Southwark, London, to Mark Sangster and Tasha Bertram. Brodie-Sangster's father's family is from Banchory, Scotland.

== Career ==
=== Early work and child acting (2000s) ===
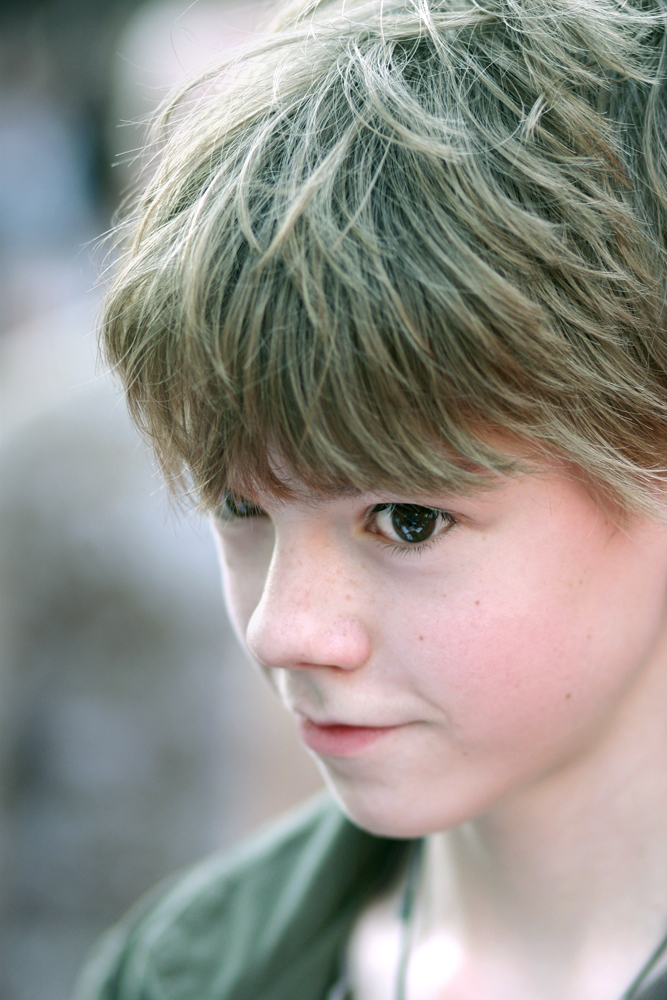
Brodie-Sangster in 2006

In 2001, Brodie-Sangter's first acting role was in a BBC television film, Station Jim. He subsequently appeared in a few more television films, including the lead roles in Bobbie's Girl, The Miracle of the Cards (based on the story of Craig Shergold) and Stig of the Dump. He won the "Golden Nymph" award at the 43rd Annual Monte Carlo Television Festival for his role in the miniseries Entrusted. Brodie-Sangster's first major theatrical film was Love Actually (2003), in which he played Sam. He was nominated for a Golden Satellite Award and a Young Artist Award for his role in the film.

Sangster next appeared in a television adaptation of the novel Feather Boy and played a younger version of James Franco's Tristan in the film version of Tristan & Isolde. Brodie-Sangster next starred in the commercially successful film Nanny McPhee (2005) as the eldest of seven children.

In 2007, he appeared in a two-part story ("Human Nature" and "The Family of Blood") in Doctor Who as schoolboy Tim Latimer, and guest-starred in the Big Finish Doctor Who audio dramas The Mind's Eye and The Bride of Peladon. He also starred in the film adaptation of Valerio Massimo Manfredi's historical novel The Last Legion, released in 2007. That same year, he voiced the character of Ferb Fletcher in the Disney Channel animated series Phineas and Ferb. He appeared in the 2008 miniseries Pinocchio, filmed in Italy, as Lampwick.

In 2008, Brodie-Sangter had a role in director Jane Campion's film Bright Star, a love story about John Keats and his lover Fanny Brawne. He also starred as Paul McCartney in Nowhere Boy, a film directed by artist Sam Taylor-Wood, about the teenage years of John Lennon.

Sangster appeared as Casey in the film Some Dogs Bite, about a boy who wants to keep his family together. He also appeared in the Irish film Death of a Superhero, based on the novel by Anthony McCarten.

=== Mature roles, independent films, and established actor (2010s) ===
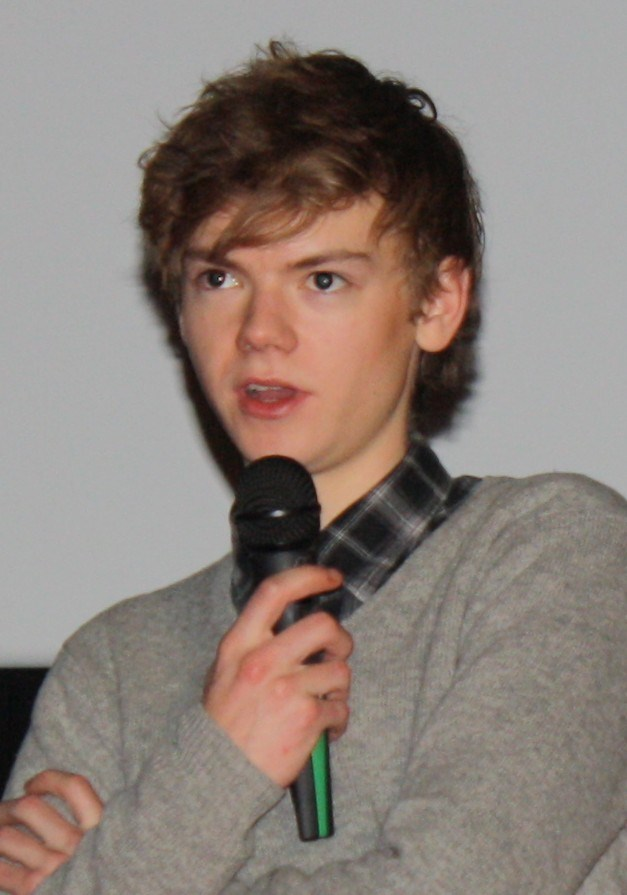
Brodie-Sangster promoting Death of a Superhero in 2011

In 2011, Brodie-Sangter played Liam in the film The Last Furlong. In April that same year, he made a guest appearance as Adam Douglas in an episode of British detective drama Lewis. In 2012, he starred in The Baytown Outlaws, in which he plays a young disabled man in a wheelchair, and in Ella Jones's short film The Ugly Duckling, the third instalment of the Tales trilogy of reworked fairy tales from More Films. From 2013 to 2014, he played the role of Jojen Reed in the HBO series Game of Thrones. Also in 2014, he starred in the Luka State's music video for their single "30 Minute Break". In 2015, he began providing the voice of John Tracy in ITV's remake of Gerry Anderson's puppet series Thunderbirds Are Go (2015–2020).

Sangster played Newt in the 20th Century Fox Maze Runner trilogy, including The Maze Runner (2014), Maze Runner: The Scorch Trials (2015), and Maze Runner: The Death Cure (2018). In BBC2's 6-part television adaptation of Wolf Hall (on BBC2 from 21 January 2015), Brodie-Sangster portrayed Ralph Sadler, the ward of Thomas Cromwell.

On 24 May 2017, a 15-minute sequel to Love Actually was released, with Brodie-Sangter as part of the cast. It was shown on the BBC as part of Comic Relief's Red Nose Day and titled Red Nose Day Actually; it brought back a large number of characters from the first film.

In 2017, Brodie-Sangter portrayed Whitey Winn in the 2017 Netflix western drama miniseries Godless, created by Scott Frank.

=== Streaming projects (2020s) ===
Sangster began the 2020s as chess player Benny Watts in the Netflix miniseries The Queen's Gambit (2020), marking his second collaboration with Frank. His performance earned Brodie-Sangster a nomination for the Primetime Emmy Award for Outstanding Supporting Actor in a Limited Series or Movie.

In 2023, Brodie-Sangter played Jack "Artful Dodger" Dawkins, originally featured in Charles Dickens' 1838 novel Oliver Twist, in the Disney+ miniseries The Artful Dodger, which follows the character after the novel's events. On 21 November 2024, it was announced that the show had been renewed for a second series and that Brodie-Sangter would reprise his role from the first series.

== Brodie Films and Winnet music ==
Sangster established Brodie Films in 2006 with his mother, Tasha Bertram, "to create opportunities in the film industry for new British talent; innovative writers, actors and directors". The company was dissolved in May 2013.

Sangster plays bass guitar and, in January 2010, joined the band Winnet, in which his mother provides vocals.

== Personal life ==
Sangster married actress Talulah Riley on 22 June 2024, in Hertfordshire, United Kingdom.

== Filmography ==
=== Film ===
Key
†	Denotes films that have not yet been released

Year	Title	Role	Notes
2003	Love Actually	Sam	
2005	Nanny McPhee	Simon Brown	
2006	Molly: An American Girl on the Home Front	Boy in spelling bee	
2006	Tristan & Isolde	Young Tristan	
2007	The Last Legion	Romulus Augustus	
2009	Bright Star	Samuel Brawne	
2009	Nowhere Boy	Paul McCartney	
2011	Hideaways	Liam	
2011	Death of a Superhero	Donald Clarke	
2011	Albatross	Mark	
2012	The Baytown Outlaws	Rob	
2014	The Maze Runner	Newt	
2014	Phantom Halo	Samuel Emerson	
2015	Maze Runner: The Scorch Trials	Newt	
2015	Star Wars: The Force Awakens	Petty Officer Thanisson	Cameo
2018	Maze Runner: The Death Cure	Newt	
2020	Dragon Rider	Firedrake	Voice role
2025	Grand Prix of Europe	Ed	Voice role

=== Television ===
Year	Title	Role	Notes
2001	Station Jim	Henry	Television film
2001	The Miracle of the Cards	Craig Shergold	Television film
2002	Stig of the Dump	Barney	Television miniseries
2002	Bobbie's Girl	Alan	Television film
2002	London's Burning	Stephen	Episode #14.6
2003	Hitler: The Rise of Evil	Young Hitler	Television film
2003	Entrusted	Thomas von Gall	Television film
2003	Ultimate Force	Gabriel	Episode: "What in the Name of God"
2004	Feather Boy	Robert Nobel	Television miniseries
2005	Julian Fellowes Investigates: A Most Mysterious Murder	John Duff	Episode: "The Case of the Croydon Poisonings"
2007–2015	Phineas and Ferb	Ferb Fletcher	Voice role; main role (seasons 1–4)
2007	Doctor Who	Tim Latimer	Episodes: "Human Nature" and "The Family of Blood"
2008	Pinocchio	Lampwick	Television film
2010	Some Dogs Bite	Casey	Television film
2010–2011	Take Two with Phineas and Ferb	Ferb Fletcher	Voice role; main role
2011	Lewis	Adam Douglas	Episode: "The Mind Has Mountains"
2011	Phineas and Ferb the Movie: Across the 2nd Dimension	Ferb Fletcher / Ferb 2	Television film; voice role
2012	Accused	Jake Murray	Episodes: "Tina's Story" and "Mo and Sue's Story"
2013–2014	Game of Thrones	Jojen Reed	Recurring role (season 3–4)
2014	American Dad!	Avery's Roommate	Voice role; episode: "I Ain't No Holodeck Boy"
2015	Wolf Hall	Rafe Sadler	Television miniseries
2015–2020	Thunderbirds Are Go	John Tracy / Pirate Dobbs	Voice role; main role
2017	Red Nose Day Actually	Sam	Television short film
2017	Godless	Whitey Winn	Miniseries
2020	The Queen's Gambit	Benny Watts	Miniseries
2022	Pistol	Malcolm McLaren	Miniseries
2022	Interrupting Chicken	Apprentice	Voice role; episode: "Dr. Chickenstein / The Sorcerer's Thesaurus"
2023–present	The Artful Dodger	Jack Dawkins	Main role
2024	Wolf Hall: The Mirror and the Light	Rafe Sadler	Miniseries

=== Video games ===
Year	Title	Role	Notes
2011	Phineas and Ferb: Across the 2nd Dimension	Ferb Fletcher / 2nd Ferb	Voice
2013	Phineas and Ferb: Quest for Cool Stuff	Ferb Fletcher	Voice

=== Music videos ===
Year	Title	Artist	Role	Notes
2014	30 Minute Break	The Luka State	Boyfriend	
2016	Tired of Lying	Kioko	–	
2020	Ballad of You & I	Hotel Lux	–	

=== Audio plays ===
Year	Title	Role	Notes
2007	Country Life	Boris	First broadcast on 22 March 2007, BBC Radio 4
2007	The Mind's Eye	Kyle	Recorded: 25, 27 July 2007; Released: November 2007
2008	The Bride of Peladon	Miner	Recorded: 26, 27 July 2007; Released: January 2008

== Awards and nominations ==
Year	Award	Category	Work	Result	Ref.
2003	Golden Nymph at Monte Carlo Television Festival	Best Actor in a Mini-series	Entrusted	Won	
2004	Phoenix Film Critics Society Awards	Best Ensemble Acting	Love Actually	Nominated	
2004	Phoenix Film Critics Society Awards	Best Performance by Youth in a Leading or Supporting Role – Male	Love Actually	Nominated	
2004	Satellite Awards	Best Performance by an Actor in a Supporting Role, Comedy or Musical	Love Actually	Nominated	
2004	Young Artist Award	Best Performance in a Feature Film – Supporting Young Actor	Love Actually	Nominated	
2007	Young Artist Award	Best Performance in a Feature Film – Leading Young Actor	Nanny McPhee	Nominated	
2007	Young Artist Award	Best Performance in a Feature Film – Young Ensemble Cast	Nanny McPhee	Nominated	
2008	Young Artist Award	Best Performance in an International Feature Film – Leading Young Performer	The Last Legion	Nominated	
2015	Teen Choice Awards	Choice Movie: Breakout Star	The Maze Runner	Nominated	
2015	Teen Choice Awards	Choice Movie: Chemistry (shared with Dylan O'Brien)	The Maze Runner	Nominated	
2016	Teen Choice Awards	Choice Movie: Chemistry (shared with Dylan O'Brien)	Maze Runner: The Scorch Trials	Won	
2021	Primetime Emmy Awards	Outstanding Supporting Actor in a Limited or Anthology Series or Movie	The Queen's Gambit	Nominated	
