= Brave Miss World =

- Official poster
- Directed by: Cecilia Peck
- Produced by: Cecilia Peck; Motty Reif; Inbal B. Lessner
- Starring: Linor Abargil
- Cinematography: Uri Ackerman; Tamara Goldsworthy
- Edited by: Inbal B. Lessner
- Music by: Hans Zimmer; Ben Harper; Martin Tillman
- Production companies: Rocket Girl Productions; Artemis Rising Foundation; Foundation for Jewish Culture; Kroll Documentary Fund; The Fledgling Fund; Channel 2; Reif Entertainment
- Distributed by: Netflix
- Release dates: April 10, 2013 (Dallas); October 15, 2013 (United States)
- Running time: 88 minutes
- Countries: United States; Israel
- Languages: English; Hebrew

Brave Miss World is a 2013 American-Israeli documentary film, directed and produced by Cecilia Peck. It follows Miss Israel Linor Abargil who won the title of Miss World in 1998, after being assaulted just weeks prior, as she spreads global awareness around sexual assault. Sharon Stone served as a co-executive producer on the film.

It had its world premiere at the Dallas International Film Festival on April 10, 2013. It had a theatrical release on November 15, 2013, followed by digital streaming on Netflix on May 29, 2014.

== Synopsis ==
In 1998, Linor Abargil won the title of Miss World, a beauty pageant after being sexually assaulted weeks prior. Abargil raises global awareness around sexual assault. Joan Collins and Fran Drescher also appear in the film.

== Cast ==
- Linor Abargil
- Alison Botha
- Joan Collins
- Fran Drescher

== Production ==
Linor Abargil began meeting with directors to encourage victims of sexual assault to speak out, seek help, and seek justice, and began meeting with film directors in Los Angeles, and met with Cecilia Peck, after seeing her previous film Dixie Chicks: Shut Up and Sing. Abargil always wanted to make a documentary in order for people not to feel alone and to reach more people than she could in person, taking her 10 years to gain the courage. The film was shot over the course of five years, as Abargil traveled the world giving speeches and meeting with victims of assault. Peck initially thought the film would be a quick shoot, but production paused several times in order to raise additional money, and the process was difficult for Abargil, also upon discovering her assaulter had been furloughed. In attempt to raise more money, the crew edited a trailer and launched an Indiegogo campaign, apart from asking friends and family for donations, before eventually securing the funds to continue production. Sharon Stone serves as a co-executive producer on the film.

== Release ==
The film had its world premiere at the Dallas International Film Festival on April 10, 2013. It also screened at the AFI Docs Film Festival on June 21, 2013. The film was released in a limited release on November 15, 2013, as part of an awards qualifying run for the Academy Awards. Shortly after, Netflix acquired distribution rights to the film and released it on May 29, 2014.

=== Impact ===
The producers of the film launched a website bravemissworld.com to share their stories of assault and to keep up with Abargil as she continues to raise awareness having over 10 million visitors on the website. The film also screens on college campuses across the United States to continue to raise awareness of sexual assault.
