= American Cinema Editors Award for Best Edited Documentary – (Non-Theatrical) =

Annual US television award

- Awarded for: Best Editing for a Non-Theatrical Documentary
- Country: United States
- Presented by: American Cinema Editors (ACE)
- Currently held by: Jabez Olssen – The Beatles: Get Back (2021)
- Website: americancinemaeditors.org

The American Cinema Editors Award for Best Edited Documentary – (Non-Theatrical) is one of the annual awards given by the American Cinema Editors. The award was first presented at the 2013 ceremony, prior to that year both film and television documentaries competed in the same category, the Best Edited Documentary – Feature award.

- From 2013 to 2018 the category was named Best Edited Documentary (Television)
- Since 2018, the category was its current name.

== Winners and nominees ==
=== 2010s ===
Best Edited Documentary (Television)

Year	Program	Episode(s)	Nominees	Network
2012
2012	American Masters	"Phil Ochs: There but for Fortune"	Pamela Scott Arnold	PBS
2012	The Weight of the Nation	"Consequences"	Paula Heredia	HBO
2012	The Dust Bowl	"The Great Plow-Up"	Craig Mellish	PBS
2013
2013	The Assassination of President Kennedy		Chris A. Peterson	CNN
2013	American Masters	"Jimi Hendrix: Hear My Train a Comin'"	Stephen Ellis, Gordon Mason, Phil McDonald	PBS
2013	American Winter		Aaron I. Butler	HBO
2014
2014	The Roosevelts: An Intimate History	"The Fire of Life (1910–1919)"	Erik Ewers	PBS
2014	Cosmos: A Spacetime Odyssey	"Standing Up in the Milky Way"	John Duffy, Michael O'Halloran, Eric Lea	Fox
2014	Pauly Shore Stands Alone		Troy Takaki, Joey Vigour	Showtime
2015
2015	The Jinx	"Chapter 1: A Body in the Bay"	Richard Hankin, Zachary Stuart-Pontier, Caitlyn Greene, Shelby Siegel	HBO
2015	Keith Richards: Under the Influence		Joshua L. Pearson	Netflix
2015	The Seventies	"United States vs. Nixon"	Chris A. Peterson	CNN
2016
2016	Everything Is Copy — Nora Ephron: Scripted & Unscripted		Bob Eisenhart	HBO
2016	FRONTLINE	"The Choice 2016"	Steve Audette	PBS
2016	We Will Rise: Michelle Obama's Mission to Educate Girls Around the World		Oliver Lief	CNN
2017
2017	Five Came Back	"The Price of Victory"	Will Znidaric	Netflix
2017	The Defiant Ones	"Part 1"	Lasse Järvi, Doug Pray	HBO
2017	Rolling Stone: Stories from the Edge	"Part I"	Ben Sozanski, Geeta Gandbhir, Andy Grieve	HBO
2017	The Nineties	"Can We All Get Along?"	Inbal B. Lessner, Jason Hardwick	CNN

Best Edited Documentary (Non-Theatrical)

Year	Program	Episode(s)	Nominees	Network
2018
2018	Robin Williams: Come Inside My Mind		Greg Finton, Poppy Das	HBO
2018	A Final Cut for Orson: 40 Years in the Making		Martin Singer	Netflix
2018	Wild Wild Country	"Part 3"	Neil Meiklejohn	Netflix
2018	The Zen Diaries of Garry Shandling		Joe Beshenkovsky	HBO
2019
2019	What's My Name: Muhammad Ali		Jake Pushinsky	HBO
2019	Abducted in Plain Sight		James Cude	Netflix
2019	Bathtubs Over Broadway		Dava Whisenant	
2019	Leaving Neverland		Jules Cornell	HBO

=== 2020s ===
Year	Program	Episode(s)	Nominees	Network
2020
2020	The Last Dance	"Episode I"	Chad Beck, Devin Concannon, Abhay Sofsky, Ben Sozanski	ESPN
2020	The Bee Gees: How Can You Mend a Broken Heart		Derek Boonstra, Robert A. Martinez	HBO
2020	Beastie Boys Story		Jeff Buchanan, Zoe Schack	Apple TV+
2020	Seduced: Inside the NXIVM Cult	"Exposed"	Inbal B. Lessner, Alex Jablonski, Gillian McCarthy, Matthew Moul, Chris A. Peterson	Starz
2021	The Beatles: Get Back	"Part 3: Days 17-22"	Jabez Olssen	Disney+
2021	100 Foot Wave	"Sea Monsters"	Connor Culhane, Adrienne Gits, Abhay Sofsky, and Brandon Valentin	HBO
2021	Allen v. Farrow	"Episode One"	Parker Laramie, Sara Newens, and Mikaela Shwer	HBO
2021	1971: The Year That Music Changed Everything	"Starman"	Sam Blair	Apple TV+
2021	Billie Eilish: The World's a Little Blurry		Greg Finton and Lindsay Utz	Apple TV+

== See also ==
- American Cinema Editors Award for Best Edited Documentary – Feature
