= Painting Churches =

Play by Tina Howe

Painting Churches is a play written by Tina Howe, first produced off-Broadway in 1983. It was a finalist for the 1984 Pulitzer Prize for Drama. The play concerns the relationship between an artist daughter and her aging parents.

== Background ==
The play grew from Howe's particular and enduring experience of art. Howe said: "Now... I'm enthralled with the French Impressionists." One theme of the play is an artist's coming of age. Howe: "How does a child get his parents to accept him not as a child, but as an artist?... There is an odyssey every child has to face in order to find his legs in his own household... The play is also about the departure of a vanishing breed..."

== Plot ==
In a townhouse in the Beacon Hill area of Boston, an elderly couple, Fanny (in her 60s) and Gardner (in his 70s) Church, are packing. They are moving to a beach home on Cape Cod. Gardner is a poet and Fanny is from a "fine old family". Their daughter Margaret (Mags), an artist who lives in New York City, has arrived to help them pack and paint their portrait. Over the course of several days, Mags sees her role in the parent-child relationship changing. Gardner is having memory problems and has become frail, and in his frustration, recites the poetry of William Butler Yeats and Robert Frost, among others. Mags finishes the portrait of her parents, in the style of Renoir. Her parents are able to see her talent, and enjoy being in a "Renoir" party as they dance a waltz.

== Production history ==
Painting Churches, produced by Second Stage Theatre, premiered off-Broadway on February 8, 1983 (previewing from January 25, 1983), at the South Street Theatre, closing on February 27, after 30 performances. The play transferred to Lamb's Theatre. where it ran from November 22, 1983, through May 20, 1984, playing 206 performances.

The production was directed by Carole Rothman, set design by Heidi Landesman, costumes by Linda Fisher, and lighting by Frances Aronson. The show featured Donald Moffat as Gardner Church (at South Street Theatre) and George Martin in the same role (at Lamb's Theatre), Frances Conroy as Margaret Church (at South Street Theatre) and then Elizabeth McGovern (in the same role) (at Lamb's Theatre), and Marian Seldes as Fanny Church (in both productions).

The play was revived off-Broadway by the Keen Company at Clurman Theatre in 2012, starring Kathleen Chalfant (Fanny), John Cunningham (Gardner), and Kate Turnbull (Mags).

The play was filmed for the public television series American Playhouse and broadcast in 1986. The cast featured Sada Thompson, Donald Moffat, and Roxanne Hart. It was remade for television in 1993 by Turner Entertainment as The Portrait, starring Gregory Peck, Lauren Bacall, and Cecilia Peck.

In regional theatre, the play was presented at the Hartman Theatre, Stamford, Connecticut, in June 1986, starring Kim Hunter, George Hamlin, and Lizbeth Mackay.

== Critical response ==
Frank Rich wrote in his review of the 1983 original production in The New York Times: " Painting Churches, which opens the Second Stage's season at its temporary new home on Theater Row, is in the dreamiest impressionistic spirit. It remakes reality with delicate, well-chosen brush strokes, finding beauty and truth in the abstract dance of light on a familiar landscape... It's a high compliment to Miss Howe... that the old bones of her material rarely peek through her writing's high, lacy gloss."

The Variety reviewer wrote of the 2012 revival: "Howe has written poignant solo moments for each of her fondly observed characters... Painting Churches is still a stunner, a group portrait painted in a soft, impressionistic style. But the shimmering lights of this visual poem have been dimmed in this too-too production — too solid, too specific, too literal, too loud, and too bright."

The reviewer for the Los Angeles Times wrote of the television film that there were "knockout performances by Sada Thompson and Donald Moffat". He praised the production: "Then there is the captivating rhythm established by writer Tina Howe and director Jack O'Brien, who skillfully wend their way in and out of various moods without signaling where they're going next."

Alvin Klein, reviewing the 1986 Hartman Theatre production for The New York Times wrote: "As the curtain falls...Fanny and Gardner Church, an elderly couple, begin a life-affirming waltz... the playwright's lyric and literate words and genuine feeling have peered through a pedestrian production."

== Awards and nominations ==
Obie Award 1983

- Performance - Donald Moffat (winner)
- Design - Heidi Landesman (winner)

Outer Critics Circle Award 1984

- Best Off-Broadway Play (winner)
- Best Actress - Marian Seldes (winner)
- John Glassner Award - Tina Howe (winner)

1984 Pulitzer Prize for Drama (finalist)
