= Noobz =

- Directed by: Blake Freeman
- Written by: Blake Freeman; Marvin Willson
- Produced by: Kip Konwiser
- Starring: Jason Mewes; Blake Freeman; Moisés Arias; Matt Shively; Zelda Williams; Casper Van Dien; Jon Gries
- Release dates: August 23, 2012 (Fantasy Filmfest); January 25, 2013 (United States)
- Running time: 97 minutes
- Country: United States
- Language: English

Noobz is a 2012 American comedy film, directed by (and also starring) Blake Freeman.

== Plot ==
Four friends face down a mace-spraying mother, a 1980s arcade champ, and Casper Van Dien in their quest to take the top prize at the Cyberbowl Video Game Championship in Los Angeles, and prove that all of those hours playing Xbox were spent wisely. When Cody (Blake Freeman) lost his job, he turned to video games for pleasure. Meanwhile, things go from bad to worse when Cody's wife grows weary of being married to a gamer, and walks out on him. But when Cody's pal Randy (Jason Mewes) rallies their old gang the Reign Clan to compete in the Cyberbowl Video Game Championship, it appears to be the perfect opportunity to put their gaming skills to use, and win a big cash prize in the process. With the old pals Oliver (Matt Shively) and "Hollywood" (Moises Arias) in tow, Cody and Andy set their sights on Los Angeles. Unfortunately for the Reign Clan, the forces of the universe seem to be working against them. Now, as the contest draws near and Andy finally gets some quality face time with gamer goddess Rickie (Zelda Williams), the Reign Clan find that their enemies on the virtual battlefield are no match for the real-life foes who are determined to see them fail.

== Cast ==
- Blake Freeman as Cody
- Moisés Arias as Hollywood
- Jason Mewes as Andy
- Jon Gries as Greg Lipstein
- Matt Shively as Oliver
- Casper Van Dien as Himself
- Sabrina Carpenter as Brittney
- Jesse Heiman as Computer Guy
- Lin Shaye as Mrs. Theodore
- Carly Craig as Melissa
- Mindy Sterling as Mrs. Robinson
- Richard Speight Jr. as Jeff
- Brien Perry as Mr. Perry
- Bill Bellamy as Brian Bankrupt Simmons
- Zelda Williams as Rickie
- Chenese Lewis as Milkshake
- Skylan Brooks as Chomomma
- India Oxenberg as Pixie teammate
- Adam Sessler as Himself

== Reception ==
Noobz received mediocre reviews; of the three critic reviews on Rotten Tomatoes, all are negative.
