= Jesse Heiman =

American actor

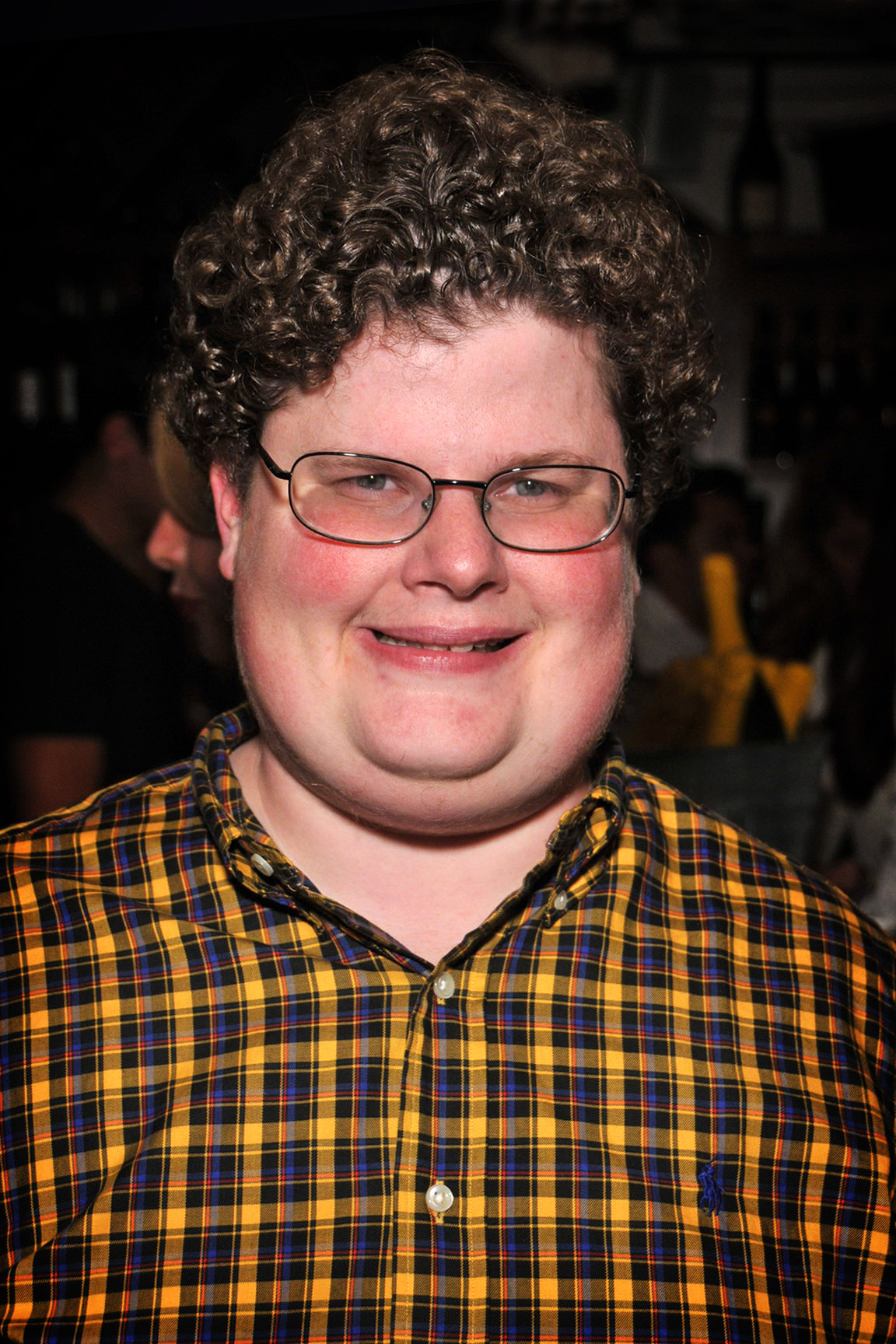
- Heiman in 2013
- Born: May 23, 1978 (age 48); Boston, Massachusetts, U.S.
- Education: Texas State University
- Occupation: Actor
- Years active: 2000–present
- Known for: Background extra
- Notable work: American Pie 2 GoDaddy Super Bowl XLVII commercial

Jesse Wayne Heiman (born May 23, 1978) is an American actor, best known for his uncredited work as an extra in a wide variety of films and television shows. He is also known for appearing in a GoDaddy commercial at Super Bowl XLVII, alongside Bar Refaeli and Danica Patrick.

== Biography ==
=== Early life ===
Jesse Heiman was born on May 23, 1978, in Boston, Massachusetts, United States. He has stated that one side of his family is Jewish and the other side is Catholic and that he grew up celebrating Christmas and Hanukkah. In 1988, he moved to Austin, Texas. In May 2000, Heiman graduated the Texas State University in San Marcos with a bachelor of arts degree in English studies. He moved to Los Angeles, California, in September 2000.

=== Career ===
Heiman began acting as a background extra in 2000. His first film role was in the 2001 film American Pie 2, and his first speaking role was in a 2002 episode of the television series Maybe It's Me. He has appeared in numerous films, television shows, commercials, and music videos, mostly working as an extra. Among most reprised extra roles in television series, he portrayed a store employee named Fernando in 32 episodes of Chuck, a student named Allan Alby in 26 episodes of Ned's Declassified School Survival Guide, and a nerd and a friend of (fictionalized) Wil Wheaton in 5 episodes of The Big Bang Theory.

On March 14, 2011, a video compilation was uploaded to YouTube, showing clips of Heiman's various appearances. Within days of the video being online, the video had over 2 million views. This made him an internet sensation and a minor celebrity.

In 2013, Heiman appeared in GoDaddy's Super Bowl XLVII commercial with Bar Refaeli and Danica Patrick, in which Refaeli, a supermodel, and Heiman share a graphic French kiss. Following the response to GoDaddy's Super Bowl XLVII commercial, Los Angeles-based porn company Assence Films extended an offer to Heiman to appear in an adult film of his choosing. Heiman responded to the offer saying "I will hold out for Playgirl". As a play on the GoDaddy commercial, singer Michael Bublé cast Heiman in the opening scene of his video "It's a Beautiful Day" where Bublé walks in on Jaime Pressly, who plays his significant other in the comical video, and Heiman sharing a kiss, to which Bublé responds by singing the song. Despite his age, he still portrays teenagers and young adults as an extra.

Heiman has earned considerable attention for his work as a background actor. Various media outlets have dubbed him one of the most, if not the most recognizable extras in film history.

== Filmography ==
=== Film ===
Year	Title	Role	Notes
2001	American Pie 2	Petey	
2002	Austin Powers in Goldmember	Student	Uncredited
2002	The Rules of Attraction	Kid at a party	Uncredited
2002	National Lampoon's Van Wilder	Student on Couch	Uncredited
2002	Catch Me If You Can	Student	Uncredited
2002	Spider-Man	Spectator at a school fight	
2003	Old School	Budnick	
2003	Freaky Friday	Student in class	
2003	The Battle of Shaker Heights		Uncredited
2004	Win A Date With Tad Hamilton!	Piggly Wiggly Shopper	Uncredited
2004	Win A Date With Tad Hamilton!	Movie patron	Uncredited
2006	The Shaggy Dog	Pound employee	Uncredited
2006	Driftwood	Inmate	Uncredited
2006	10 Items or Less		Stand-in; uncredited
2007	Knocked Up		Stand-in
2007	Cougar Club	Prey	Uncredited
2007	Skyler's Revolution	Himself	
2007	The Untitled Rob Roy Thomas Project		
2008	Forgetting Sarah Marshall	Theatre audience member	Uncredited; also a stand-in
2008	Keith	Chemistry class student	Uncredited; also a stand-in
2008	An American Carol	Young Michael Malone	
2009	The Jerk Theory	Clinton	
2009	17 Again	Mascot	Uncredited
2010	The Social Network	Student	Uncredited
2010	Privileged	Party attendant	Short film; uncredited
2011	Transformers: Dark of the Moon	Office worker	Uncredited
2011	Detention	Nerd	
2011	The Nature of Hatman	Young adult	
2011	Getting That Girl	Nerd #1	
2011	All in All		Short film
2012	Magic Mike Auditions	Barney	Short film
2012	Noobz	Computer Guy	
2012	A Thousand Words		Stand-in
2013	Browsers	Concert audience member	
2013	As I Lay Dying	Jody	
2014	Neighbors	Babysitter	
2014	Sobert Companion		
2014	Obituaries	Jerry Cunkle	Short film
2014	Awkward Party	Jesse Heman	Short film
2015	Schmoolie the Deathwatcher	Schmoolie	Short film
2016	The Wedding Party	Person in the bar	
2016	The HookUP	Buzz	
2017	The Clapper	Audience member	Uncredited
2018	Half Magic	Demarcus	
2018	Thank You for Your Patients	Usher	
2019	Artista Obscura	Pedestrian Goober	
2020	Greatland	Dormitory resident	
2020	Pink Skies Ahead	Thomas	
2024	The Court Jester	David	Short film
TBA	Jesse Heiman: World's Greatest Extra	Himself	Documentary film; upcoming

=== Television series ===
Year	Title	Role	Notes
2001	Power Rangers Time Force	New gym member	Episode: "Undercover Rangers" (no. 31)
2002	Maybe It's Me	Elliot	Episode: "The Video Episode" (no. 15)
2002	Do Over	Student	Episode: "Pilot" (no. 1); uncredited
2003	That's So Raven	Student	Episode: "Mother Dearest" (no. 1); uncredited
2003	A.U.S.A.	Monopoly Game Piece Thief	Episode: "Pilot" (no. 1); uncredited
2004	Jack & Bobby	Teenager at the meeting	Episode: "Better Days" (no. 2)
2004	Grounded for Life	Sherman	Episode: "Can't Get Next to You" (no. 67); uncredited
2004	Cracking Up	Streaking Pledge	Episode: "Learning Disability" (no. 7); uncredited
2004	Joan of Arcadia	Student using a Beer bong	Episode: "Out of Sight" (no. 25); uncredited
2004–2007	Drake & Josh	Student and a spectator at a concert	3 episodes
2004–2007	Ned's Declassified School Survival Guide	Allan Alby, a student	26 episodes; uncredited
2005	George Lopez	Boy in a restaurant	Episode: "Friends Don't Let Friends Marry Drunks" (no. 68)
2005	My Name Is Earl	Student with an inhaler	Episode: "Randy's Touchdown" (no. 3); uncredited
2005	The O.C.	Nerd in the crowd	Episode: "The Showdown" (no. 49); uncredited
2005	Las Vegas	Geek	Episode: "Hide and Sneak" (no. 44); uncredited
2005	NCIS	Fredrick Pippin	Episode: "Red Cell" (no. 43)
2005	Reno 911!	American Idol contestant	2 episodes; uncredited
2005	Entourage	Nerd #1	Episode: "I Love You Too" (no. 17)
2005	Arrested Development	Audience member at screening	Episode: "Making a Stand" (no. 48); uncredited
2006	Bones	Teenage hero	Episode: "The Superhero in the Alley" (no. 12); uncredited
2006	Campus Ladies	Student	Episode: "Lesbian Lovers" (no. 3); uncredited
2006	Mind of Mencia	Nerd	Episode no. 15
2007	The New Adventures of Old Christine	Waiter #1	Episode: "Let Him Eat Cake" (no. 27)
2007	Curb Your Enthusiasm	Mondo Gelato customer	Episode: "The Ida Funkhouser Roadside Memorial" (no. 53); uncredited
2007–2012	Chuck	Fernando	31 episodes
2008	Pushing Daisies	Diner patron	Episode: "Robbing Hood" (no. 16); uncredited
2009	Heroes	Sam's Comics customer	Episode: "Shades of Gray" (no. 53); uncredited
2009	Better Off Ted	Employee	Episode: "Get Happy" (no. 7); uncredited
2009	Monk	3rd UFO enthusiast	Episode: "Mr. Monk and the UFO" (no. 112)
2009	Greek	Superhero	Episode: "The Dork Knight" (no. 51)
2010	Warren the Ape	Jesse	Episode: "Abstinence" (no. 2)
2010	Warren the Ape	Himself	Episode: "Rock Opera" (no. 12)
2010	Good Luck Charlie	Moviegoer	Episode: "Blankie Go Bye-Bye" (no. 14); uncredited
2010–2011	Glee	Student	2 episodes; uncredited
2010–2011	Hollywood Wasteland	Stan Getz	2 episodes
2010–2013	The Big Bang Theory	Nerd	5 episodes; uncredited
2011	How I Met Your Mother	Person buying a hotdog	Episode: "Desperation Day" (no. 128); uncredited
2011	Awkward	Nerd	Episode: "Knocker Nightmare" (no. 2)
2011	Suburgatory	Student	Episode: "Halloween" (no. 5)
2011	Funny or Die Presents	Lap Guy	1 episode
2011	Nightline	Himself	Episode dated June 20, 2011
2011–2013	The Tonight Show with Jay Leno	Himself	2 episodes
2013	The Tonight Show with Jay Leno	Walter	Episode no. 4,403; uncredited; additionally usage of his archival footage in two more episodes
2012	Parks and Recreation	Person using a water fountain	Episode: "Campaign Shake-Up" (no. 63); uncredited
2012	Franklin & Bash	Spectator	Episode: "Viper" (no. 12)
2012	Pair of Kings	Dirt Fairy	Episode: "Fatal Distraction" (no. 49); uncredited
2012	Breaking In	Contra agent	3 episodes; uncredited
2012	Crash & Bernstein	Toby	Episode: "Crash Lands" (no. 1); uncredited
2012	It's Always Sunny in Philadelphia	Party attendant	Episode: "Charlie Rules the World" (no. 92); uncredited
2013	The Mindy Project	Concession kid	Episode: "Harry & Sally" (no. 13)
2013	Chelsea Lately	Walter	Episode dated February 4, 2013; archival footage
2013	Good Day L.A.	Himself	Episode dated February 6, 2013
2013	The Geekie Awards	Himself	TV special
2014	Criminal Minds	Ethan	Episode: "The Black Queen" (no. 198)
2014	Dog Park	Nerd	Episode: "Leave It" (no. 2)
2014	I'll Bring the Awkward	Person with a lawnmower	Episode: "Your Own Way" (no. 11)
2015	The Enemy: The N in Me	Kyle	Episode no. 5
2015	Inside the Extras Studio	Himself	Episode: "The World's Greatest Extra" (no. 4)
2016	Angie Tribeca	Husband from the Midwest	Episode: "Beach Blanket Sting-O" (no. 13); uncredited
2016	Stalking LeVar	Wrigley Wesley Crusher	2 episodes
2016	Gilmore Girls: A Year in the Life	Extra in Kirk's second film	Episode: "Spring" (no. 2)
2017	Powerless	Employee	2 episodes; uncredited
2017	S.W.A.T.	Tourist	Episode: "Cuchillo" (no. 2); uncredited
2017	The Goldbergs	Thanksgiving guest	Episode: "A Wall Street Thanksgiving" (no. 102); uncredited
2019	The Goldbergs	Leroy	Episode: "Animal House" (no. 144); uncredited
2018	Bizness as Usual	Face caller	Episode: "Please Hold" (no. 58)
2018	Silicon Valley	Programmer	2 episodes; uncredited
2023	Hollywood Madness	Himself	2 episodes

=== Music videos ===
Year	Title	Role	Notes
2002	"I'm Just a Kid" by Simple Plan	Student	Uncredited
2002	"Starlight" by Zed	Student	Uncredited
2003	"Stuck" by Stacie Orrico	Boy getting out of a bus	
2005	"I'm Not Your Girl" by Lalaine		
2011	"Dancing Shoes" by DEV	Guy dancing in tutu	
2013	"It's a Beautiful Day" by Michael Bublé	Fake yoga instructor	
2014	"Groove" by Oiki	Marty	
