= I Married a Princess =

- Genre: Reality Television
- Directed by: Chris Harty
- Country of origin: United States
- Original language: English
- No. of seasons: 1
- No. of episodes: 13

Production
- Production locations: Belgrade, Serbia
- Running time: 30 minutes
- Production company: New Wave Entertainment

Original release
- Network: Lifetime
- Release: April 18 – May 2, 2005

I Married a Princess is a reality show starring Catherine Oxenberg and her husband Casper Van Dien that aired on Lifetime from 18 April to 2 May 2005.

== Participating personalities ==
- Catherine Oxenberg
- Casper Van Dien
- India Oxenberg, Catherine's daughter
- Cappy Van Dien, Casper's son
- Grace Van Dien, Casper's daughter
- Maya Van Dien, daughter of Catherine and Casper
- Celeste Alma Van Dien, daughter of Catherine and Casper
