= Craig Shergold =

British former cancer patient (1979–2020)

- Born: 24 June 1979; Carshalton, Surrey, England
- Died: 21 April 2020 (aged 40)
- Known for: Receiving 350 million greeting cards, a world record

Craig Shergold (24 June 1979 – 21 April 2020) was a British cancer patient who received an estimated 350 million greeting cards, earning him a place in the Guinness Book of World Records. Variations of the plea for greeting cards on his behalf in 1989 are still being distributed through the Internet, making the plea one of the most persistent urban legends.

== Background ==
In 1988, Craig Shergold began complaining of earaches. After antibiotics were unsuccessful in treating his symptoms, in 1989, doctors diagnosed him, at the age of nine, with what they considered terminal brain cancer.

== Greeting card campaign ==
Shergold's friends and relatives began a chain letter campaign requesting individuals to send greeting cards to him with the goal of beating the Guinness Book of World Records for 1,000,065 greeting cards received. Craig received greeting cards from all over the world including celebrities like Madonna and Arnold Schwarzenegger.

The Children's Wish Foundation became involved in the campaign in the early stages and quickly became overwhelmed by the volume of cards being received, though they later disavowed any connection with the chain letter campaigns.

The campaign was successful and Shergold's name was added to the 1991 Guinness Book of World Records as having received 16,250,692 get-well cards by May 1990, and again in the 1992 Guinness Book of World Records as having received 33 million cards by May 1991.

== Treatment ==
Shergold's cancer worsened. His British doctors estimated he might only have a few weeks of life remaining and suggested the family bring him home for the last few weeks. American billionaire John Kluge, founder of Metromedia, learned of Shergold's illness and arranged for him to travel to the US for a new type of operation. He was operated on in 1991 at the University of Virginia Medical Center, where a physician was able to remove virtually all of the tumour except for a benign fragment.

== Chain letter popularity ==
Even after his recovery, the chain letter continued to circulate and millions of greeting cards continued to flow to Shergold's home. Shergold estimated that by 1998, he had received a total of 250 million cards. Variants of the chain mail changed Shergold's name to "Craig Shelford", "Craig Stafford", "Craig Shefford", "Greg Sherwood", or, a version particularly popular in Poland, "Draing Sherold". Another variant involves requests for business cards. A related chain letter which retained Shergold's address (in a somewhat corrupted form) asked secretaries and heads of Polish public institutions and local authorities to send get-well cards to a "Harold Sarid".

The Royal Mail gave their home its own postal code because of the volume of mail they received. To avoid the deluge of mail, the family halted mail delivery and later moved.

== Legacy ==
Throughout his life, he received approximately 350 million greeting cards. As an adult, he did not make any public appearances other than to express his new wish–for the mail to stop. As of 2013, he continued to receive cards, sent to his old address.

The Make-A-Wish Foundation also states on their website that they do not engage in chain letters or telemarketing activities and also denies any involvement in fulfilling Shergold's original wish, stating that it was done by another wish-granting organization. Any mail that is received is forwarded to a recycling center.

== In popular media ==
In 1993, Shergold's mother, Marion, wrote a book about her son's story entitled, Craig Shergold : A Mother's Story. On 10 November 2001, PAX TV aired a made-for-TV movie, The Miracle of the Cards. The movie starred Thomas Sangster as Shergold and also featured Kirk Cameron as a cynical reporter.

== World record retired ==
Guinness World Records has retired the record and requested that individuals no longer respond to any requests for greeting cards.

== Death ==
He died on 21 April 2020, from COVID-19-related pneumonia. Before his funeral a "Craig's song challenge" was issued to raise money for charity.

== See also ==
- List of Internet phenomena
- List of people with brain tumors
