= Roman Holiday (1987 film) =

- Genre: Comedy; Drama; Romance
- Based on: Roman Holiday; 1953 film by William Wyler
- Written by: Jerry Ludwig
- Story by: Dalton Trumbo
- Directed by: Noel Nosseck
- Starring: Catherine Oxenberg; Tom Conti; Ed Begley Jr.
- Music by: Mark Snow
- Country of origin: United States
- Original language: English

Production
- Producer: Mel Efros
- Cinematography: Romano Albani
- Editor: Jay Scherberth
- Running time: 100 minutes
- Production companies: Jerry Ludwig Enterprises; Paramount Television

Original release
- Network: NBC
- Release: December 28, 1987

Roman Holiday is a 1987 American made-for-television romantic comedy film based on 1953 film of the same name.

== Plot ==
The plot features Princess Elysa (Catherine Oxenberg), who is touring Rome, and decides to get 'out and about' away from her normal life. She meets an American reporter and his photographer, who show her the sights. The reporter at first is more interested in a story than in the princess, but he begins to fall for her.

== Cast ==
- Catherine Oxenberg - Princess Elysa
- Tom Conti - Joe Bradley
- Ed Begley Jr. - Leonard Lupo
- Paul Daneman - King
- Eileen Atkins - Countess
- Patrick Allen - General
- Francis Matthews - Ambassador
- Shane Rimmer - Hogan
- Christopher Muncke - Phil
- Tessa Hood - Secretary
- Andrew Bicknell - Elite Guard (Squad Leader)
- David Rolfe - Major Domo
