= Overexposed (film) =

- Directed by: Larry Brand
- Written by: Larry Brand; Rebecca Reynolds
- Produced by: Roger Corman
- Starring: Catherine Oxenberg; David Naughton; Karen Black
- Production company: Concorde Productions
- Distributed by: Concorde Pictures
- Release date: 1990
- Running time: 80 mins
- Country: USA
- Language: English

Overexposed is a 1990 American thriller film directed by Larry Brand and produced by Roger Corman.

== Plot ==
Morrison (Larry Brand) investigates when the colleagues of beautiful soap star Kristin (Catherine Oxenberg) start disappearing. Morrison realizes Kristin herself is being stalked and needs protection from the invisible threat.

== Cast ==
- Catherine Oxenberg as Kristin
- Larry Brand as Morrison
- David Naughton as Phillip
- Karen Black as Mrs Trowbridge
- Jennifer Edwards as Helen
- Barney Burman as Uniformed Officer
- William Bumiller as Hank
- George Derby as Lt Bryce
- Brewster Gould as Jensen
- Ernest Alexander as Eugene
- Gil Christner as Liquor Store Owner

== Reception ==
Variety wrote, "Basically a yawner, Overexposed manages to pique some interest with a grotesque twist ending, but it’s not enough to make the preceding 70 minutes worthwhile. Pic’s exploitable theme could result in some ancillary business, but b.o. potential is limited to the sleaze circuit."
