= The Miracle of the Cards =

- Genre: Drama
- Written by: Lee Wilson
- Directed by: Mark Griffiths
- Starring: Thomas Sangster; Kirk Cameron; Karin Konoval; Catherine Oxenberg; Peter Wingfield; Richard Thomas
- Music by: Ken Harrison
- Countries of origin: United States; Canada
- Original language: English

Production
- Executive producers: Timothy O. Johnson; Lee Wilson; Robert Woods
- Producer: Deboragh Gabler
- Cinematography: Henry Lebo
- Editor: Roger Mattiussi
- Running time: 89 minutes
- Production companies: Legacy Filmworks; Viacom Productions; Paxson Communications Corporation

Original release
- Network: PAX
- Release: November 10, 2001

The Miracle of the Cards is 2001 American made-for-television drama film distributed by Cloud Ten Pictures. It starred Kirk Cameron, Karin Konoval, Catherine Oxenberg, Peter Wingfield, Thomas Sangster, and Richard Thomas. It first aired on November 10, 2001, on PAX (now known as Ion Television).

The Miracle of the Cards' taglines were "Witness the power of faith" and "Can the whole world's prayers work a miracle?" It was not rated by the Motion Picture Association of America.

== Plot ==
The Miracle of the Cards is based on the true story of English youngster Craig Shergold (Thomas Sangster), who in 1988 is diagnosed with a brain tumor. Although the prognosis is negative, Craig's mother Marion (Catherine Oxenberg) becomes convinced that there is a cure for it, and that the means of finding that cure is to break the Guinness World Record for receiving greeting cards. Broadcasting a plea to everyone in the world, Marion is successful in bringing over a million cards to Craig's door. One of those cards provides the key for Craig's ultimate salvation. A cynical reporter, Josh (Kirk Cameron), finds himself witnessing a miracle he can hardly believe.

== Cast ==
- Kirk Cameron as Josh
- Catherine Oxenberg as Marion Shergold
- Thomas Brodie-Sangster as Craig Shergold (credited as Thomas Sangster)
- Peter Wingfield as Ernie Shergold
- Jeremy Guilbaut as Steve Shergold
- Jennifer Carmichael as Sharon Shergold (credited as Jennifer Anne Carmichael)
- Michael Dobson as Dr. Belling (credited as Michael R. Dobson)
- Duncan Fraser as Dr. Farley Middleton
- Anna Cummer as Nurse Theresa
- Brenda Crichlow as Doreen
- Jodelle Ferland as Annie
- Matthew Harrison as Ryan Philips
- Richard Thomas as Dr. Neal Kassell
- Rick Tae as Dr. Kassell's Assistant
- Sheila Tyson as Female Doctor
