= Desperately Seeking Soulmate: Escaping Twin Flames Universe =

2023 American TV documentary series

- Release poster
- Genre: Documentary
- Directed by: Marina Zenovich
- Music by: Ariel Marx
- Country of origin: United States
- Original language: English
- No. of episodes: 3

Production
- Executive producers: Marina Zenovich; Alice Hines; Julia Nottingham; Sam Starbuck; P. G. Morgan; Todd Black; Jason Blumenthal; Jordan Edelstein
- Producer: Hattie Bridges Webb
- Cinematography: Nick Higgins; Ben Bloodwell; Wolfgang Held
- Editors: Erin Perri; Betsy Kagen; Eliot Goldner
- Running time: 40–50 minutes
- Production companies: Dorothy Street Pictures; Escape Artists; PMZ Pictures; MGM Television; Amazon Studios

Original release
- Network: Amazon Prime Video
- Release: October 6, 2023

Desperately Seeking Soulmate: Escaping Twin Flames Universe is a 2023 American true crime documentary series directed and produced by Marina Zenovich. It explores the world of Twin Flames Universe, a cult run by Jeff and Shaleia Divine.

It premiered on October 6, 2023, on Amazon Prime Video. (Trailer)

== Premise ==
Based on reporting by Alice Hines for Vanity Fair, the series explores the world of Twin Flames Universe, a cult run by Jeff and Shaleia Divine. Promising to match members with their perfect partners, former members describe extreme lengths they have taken in order to match with their partner.

== Episodes ==
No.	Title	Directed by	Original release date
1	"Welcome to the Party"	Marina Zenovich	October 6, 2023
2	"Matchmakers"	Marina Zenovich	October 6, 2023
3	"Two Halves of The Same Soul"	Marina Zenovich	October 6, 2023

== Production ==
The series went through extensive research and fact checking to prevent potential legal action. Producers reached out to Jeff and Shaleia Divine but the couple declined to participate.

In June 2022, it was announced Amazon Prime Video had greenlit an untitled documentary series revolving around the Twin Flames Universe, based upon reporting for Vanity Fair by Alice Hines. In August 2023, it was announced the series had been titled Desperately Seeking Soulmate: Escaping Twin Flames Universe.

== Reception ==
A Rolling Stone article compared Twin Flames Universe portrayal in Desperately Seeking Soulmates to other portrayals of prosperity gospel, such as HBO's The Righteous Gemstones.

== See also ==
- Escaping Twin Flames
