= India Oxenberg =

American actress (born 1991)

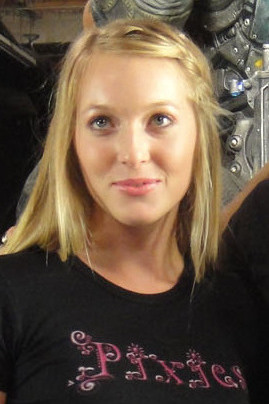
- Oxenberg in 2011
- Born: India Riven Oxenberg; June 7, 1991 (age 35); Malibu, California, U.S.
- Occupations: Actress; television personality
- Years active: 2001–present
- Spouse: Patrick D'Ignazio (m. 2020)
- Children: 1
- Mother: Catherine Oxenberg
- Family: Karađorđević

India Riven Oxenberg (born June 7, 1991) is an American actress and documentary film producer. A granddaughter of Princess Elizabeth of Yugoslavia, she is a relative of the House of Karađorđević, the former royal family of Serbia and, later, Yugoslavia. Oxenberg began her career as a child actress, with small roles in film and television projects that her mother, Catherine Oxenberg, and then-stepfather, Casper Van Dien, were involved in. As a teenager, she was a cast member of the reality television series I Married a Princess.

From 2011 to 2018, Oxenberg was involved in NXIVM, an American multi-level marketing company widely described as a cult. While in NXIVM she was introduced to a secret group "DOS" and was groomed to be a sexual partner of NXIVM's founder, Keith Raniere. In 2020, she published the book Still Learning: A Memoir. She also produced and stars in the documentary series Seduced: Inside the NXIVM Cult, which details her time in the cult.

== Early life and education ==
Oxenberg was born on June 7, 1991, to actress Catherine Oxenberg and William Weitz Shaffer. Oxenberg's father was arrested in 1992 for smuggling marijuana from Thailand, reportedly profiting $50 million from drug trading. Her maternal grandparents are Princess Elizabeth of Yugoslavia and Howard Oxenberg, a Jewish dress manufacturer. As a great-granddaughter of Prince Regent Paul of Yugoslavia (Elizabeth's father), Oxenberg is a descendant of the House of Karađorđević, which ruled Serbia and Yugoslavia. Oxenberg is also a relative of the British royal family, the Danish royal family, and the Greek royal family through her great-grandmother, Princess Olga of Greece and Denmark. Finnish philanthropist Aurora Karamzin was her maternal great-great-great-great-grandmother. She is a niece of writer and fashion designer Christina Oxenberg.

She grew up in Malibu, California, and graduated from Malibu High School.

In 2008, Oxenberg was presented to society at Le Bal des débutantes at the Hôtel de Crillon in Paris. She was one of two descendants of the Karađorđević dynasty to make her debut at Le Bal that year, alongside her cousin Victoria de Silva, the daughter of Princess Katarina and Sir Desmond de Silva.

== Career ==
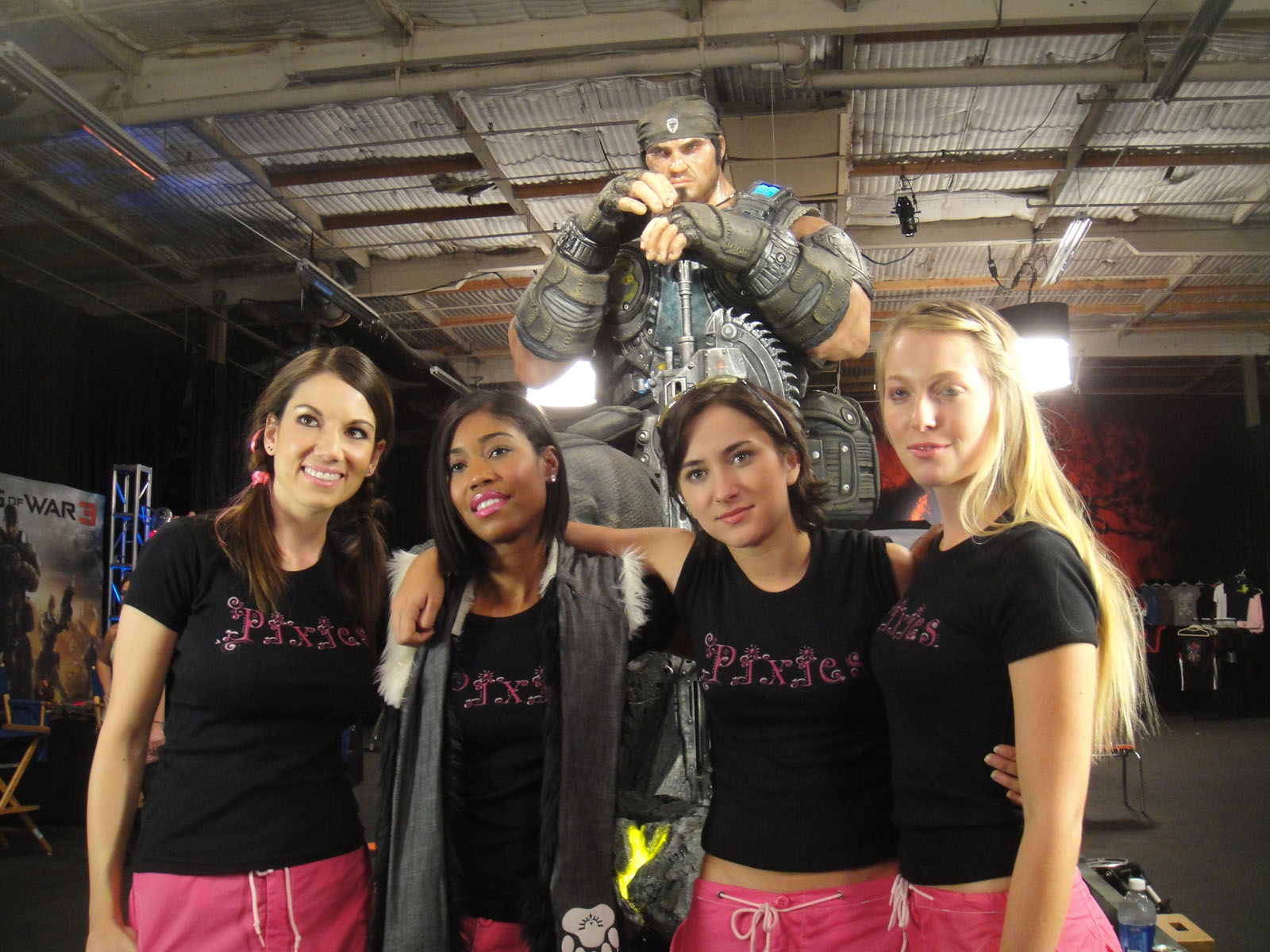
Oxenberg (right) with cast members of Noobz in 2011

Oxenberg's first film was the 2001 television drama The Miracle of the Cards. In 2002, Oxenberg played the role of Mattie in the science fiction television film The Vector File.

Oxenberg was a cast member on the 2005 Lifetime reality television series I Married a Princess, which followed her family while her mother was married to Casper Van Dien. That year, she also had minor role in the video game adaptation of the film Starship Troopers and a role in the Syfy original movie The Fallen Ones.

In 2009, she had a small role in the Disney film Princess Protection Program. In 2012, she portrayed a Pixie Teammate in the comedy film Noobz.

== Personal life ==
In 2018, Oxenberg met Patrick D'Ignazio, a chef, while working as a manager for a restaurant in New York City. They got engaged in October 2019 and were married civilly (notary public) in Los Angeles on December 3, 2020. The couple moved to Key West in 2022, where D’Ignazio opened a restaurant. Oxenberg and D’Ignazio had their first child, a girl, in 2024.

=== NXIVM ===
After attending college for one year, Oxenberg, alongside her mother, enrolled in a self-help entrepreneurship course hosted by NXIVM, following a recommendation from a family friend. While they initially started the program together, Oxenberg's mother eventually withdrew. She was mentored by Sarah Edmondson, Mark Vicente, and Bonnie Piesse. In January 2015, after five years in NXIVM, Oxenberg was approached by Allison Mack about joining a secret sorority, "DOS". In DOS, Mack became a mentor to Oxenberg. Oxenberg was instructed to provide personal family secrets and pose for nude photographs for Mack, who also limited the amount of food Oxenberg could eat and required her to cook and clean for her while living with Mack in Albany, New York. Throughout this process, Oxenberg was groomed to become a sexual partner for NXIVM's founder and the leader of DOS, Keith Raniere. She was one of multiple women in the organization who became Raniere's sexual partners. In January 2016, Oxenberg was held down and branded with the initials of Raniere. She was told, at the time, that the brand was a representation of the "elements" and was unaware that it was actually Raniere's initials. Oxenberg left NXIVM in 2018.

While Oxenberg was involved in NXIVM, her mother Catherine tried to get her out of the organization and expose the cult through media in 2017. In 2018, Catherine wrote the book Captive: A Mother's Crusade to Save Her Daughter from a Terrifying Cult. In 2019, Catherine produced the Lifetime television movie Escaping the NXIVM Cult: A Mother's Fight to Save Her Daughter. Oxenberg officially left NXIVM in the summer of 2018 and moved back to Malibu with her mother.

Oxenberg's time in the cult was discussed in the HBO 2020 documentary The Vow. Oxenberg produced and starred in the 2020 Starz documentary series Seduced: Inside the NXIVM Cult. The documentary details her life while she was an active member in NXIVM. In 2020, she also published the memoir Still Learning: A Memoir, which revisits the emotional, physical, and sexual abuse she endured as a member of NXIVM, and her steps to recovery.

Oxenberg had her NXIVM brand covered up with a tattoo of a mandala and the inscription "ancora imparo" (i'm still learning) by a tattoo artist in New York City's East Village.

== Filmography ==
- The Miracle of the Cards as a stand-in (2001)
- The Vector File as Mattie (2002)
- I Married a Princess as herself (2005)
- Starship Troopers (2005)
- The Fallen Ones as kitten wrangler (2005)
- Princess Protection Program as herself (2009)
- Noobz as Pixie teammate (2012)
- The Vow as herself (2020)
- Seduced: Inside the NXIVM Cult as herself (2020)
