= Twin flame =

New Age concept

A twin flame is a concept in New Age spirituality describing the belief that a single soul can be split into two bodies, resulting in two individuals who share an unusually intense spiritual and emotional bond. Proponents describe twin flames as "mirror souls", whose reunion is understood as a catalyst for personal growth, healing, and spiritual awakening. The concept is discussed primarily within spiritual and self-help contexts and has no documented scientific basis.

Though the idea draws on ancient philosophical traditions, the specific term was introduced in Victorian literature and popularized in the late 20th century through New Age religious movements. The twin flame concept is distinct from the related notion of a soulmate.

== History ==
In his 4th-century BC text Symposium, the Greek philosopher Plato introduces an origin myth for the sexes, in which the first human beings were double in form, with two faces, four arms, and four legs. After angering the gods, they were split in two, leaving each person searching for their missing half. Some writers have made a connection between this myth and the concept of twin flames.

The English novelist Marie Corelli is credited with coining the term "twin flame" (used interchangeably with "twin soul") in her 1886 novel A Romance of Two Worlds. The Twin Soul, an 1887 novel attributed to Corelli's adoptive father, Charles Mackay, but likely co-written by Corelli, centers around the concept.

The American spiritual leader and author Elizabeth Clare Prophet popularized the term in the 1970s.

== Concept and beliefs ==
=== Definition ===
In twin flame belief, two people are thought to share an intense spiritual or emotional bond, often described by adherents as a deep connection between their souls. Proponents often describe twin flames as "mirror souls" or as "two halves of the same soul" incarnated separately and destined to reunite.

Believers typically associate twin-flame relationships with strong recognition, emotional intensity, personal transformation, and spiritual growth. Popular accounts often distinguish the concept from ordinary romantic relationships or soulmate relationships by emphasizing the connection's perceived intensity and transformative purpose.

=== Stages or phases ===
Descriptions of twin-flame relationships in mainstream sources often outline a series of phases. There is an initial period of intense attraction or recognition, followed by a shift into emotional turbulence or conflict that adherents interpret as an opportunity for individual healing or self-development. Others believe that once you heal the inner conflict, twin flames come together.

== See also ==
- Twin Flames Universe
