= Linor Abargil =

Israeli beauty pageant titleholder

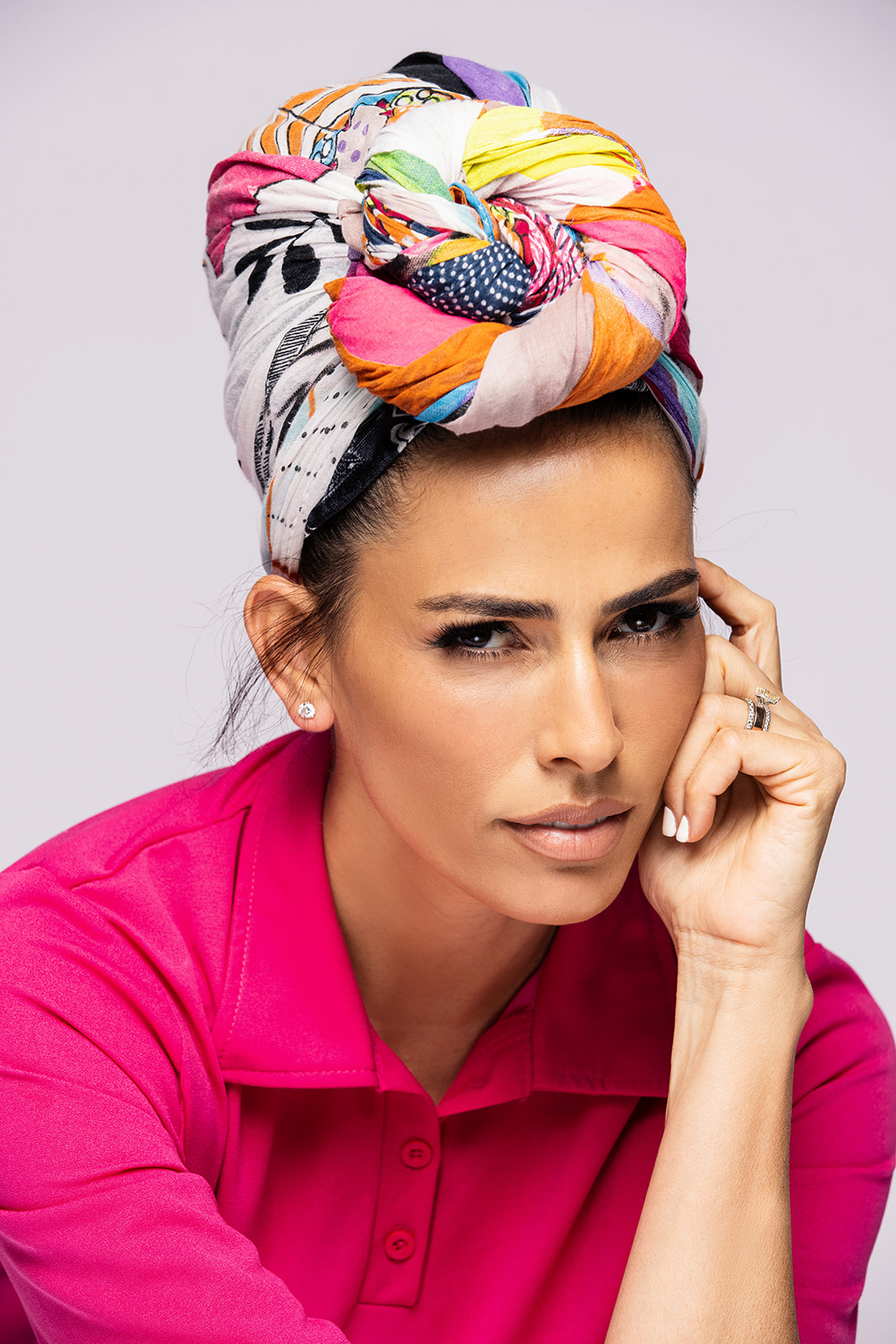
- Abargil in 2022
- Born: February 17, 1980 (age 46); Netanya, Israel
- Known for: Miss Israel 1998; Miss World 1998 (Winner) (Miss World Europe)
- Spouses: Šarūnas Jasikevičius (m. 2006; div. 2008) Oren Calfon (m. 2010)
- Children: 4
- Modeling information
- Height: 1.79 m (5 ft 10 1/2 in)
- Hair color: Black
- Eye color: Brown

Linor Abargil (Hebrew: לינור אברג'יל, sometimes spelled Linor Aberjil; born February 17, 1980) is an Israeli attorney, actress, model and beauty queen who won the Miss World 1998, shortly after being raped. Since then, she has become a global advocate in the fight against sexual violence. She was crowned by her predecessor Miss World 1997, Diana Hayden. She was preceded and succeeded by Indian delegates.

== Biography ==
Abargil was born in Netanya, Israel, the eldest child of Aliza and Jackie Abargil. Her family is of Moroccan-Jewish descent.

In 1996, at age 16, she was signed by Look modeling agency, and proceeded to win the title "Discovery of the Year" in the 1997 modeling contest. In 1998, at 18, she was crowned Miss Israel, and went on to compete in the Miss World competition in Seychelles.

Just seven weeks before the competition, then 18-year-old Abargil was raped at knifepoint and stabbed by Uri Shlomo Nur, a travel agent from Milan. Abargil was referred to Nur by her Italian modeling agency for assistance changing her flight back to Israel. Nur told Abargil that it would be easier to get on a plane from Rome, and offered to take her there in his car. On the way, he pulled onto an isolated dirt road, where he threatened Abargil with a knife, bound her in the back seat, and raped her, after which he began stabbing and strangling her with a rope. Certain that he intended to kill her, Abargil managed to escape by assuring Nur that she knew this was "not really him" and that she wouldn't tell anyone. However, as soon as she got to the Rome train station, she called her mother to tell her what happened, and then met a woman who accompanied her to get a medical examination and to report the rape to the police. The Italian authorities, however, promptly released Nur, and then declined to prosecute.

Abargil went on to win the Miss World title, returning home to Israel to heightened fame and public attention, which she reported made it difficult for her to deal with her continuing trauma, and resulted in difficulty carrying out her duties as Miss World.

Frustrated by the refusal of the Italian authorities to pursue the case, Abargil reported the rape to Israeli authorities, who issued an arrest warrant for Nur and began extradition proceedings. Due to a media blackout on the case in Israel, Nur was unaware of the charges pending against him. When he returned to Israel a few months later to visit family, he was arrested at the airport. He was tried for rape, sodomy, and abduction, and was convicted with the help of DNA evidence found in his car. Nur was sentenced to 16 years in prison. When he came up for parole, Abargil mounted a campaign against his release, and he ultimately served his entire sentence. By this time, she had already become a well-known activist, calling for other women to follow her example and report their assaults to the police.

After being crowned Miss World, Abargil continued to work as a model in Israel and internationally, and enrolled to study drama at Beit Zvi School for the Performing Arts. Afterwards, she appeared in several plays and television series. However, following her decision to become an Orthodox Jew in 2009, which put an end to her modeling, and her commitment to fighting sexual violence, Abargil chose a new direction: she decided to study law at the Netanya Academic College. She then went on to work for the Tel Aviv District Attorney.

=== Brave Miss World ===
In 2008, Abargil initiated filming of a documentary film, titled Brave Miss World, based on her rape and subsequent activism. Directed by Cecilia Peck, the film followed Abargil as she traveled the world, lecturing to groups and meeting women and encouraging them to talk about their experiences with sexual violence. The film also documents her attempts to deal with the aftermath of the violence she experienced, her relationships with family members, her eventual embracing of Orthodox Judaism (after which she no longer worked as a model), the campaign to keep Nur imprisoned, her decision to study law and work for the District Attorney's Office, and the release of a song she wrote about forgiveness between mother and daughter after the daughter is raped. Among the women participating in the film are students, mothers, elderly women, and several celebrities such as Joan Collins and Fran Drescher, who recounted their own stories of sexual assault. At the end of the film, Abargil retraces her steps in Italy, from before and after the rape, meets with those who helped her, such as the examining physician, and confronts the modeling agents whom she holds responsible for knowingly sending her and other young women into danger from known sexual predators. The film also follows Abargil's personal life, her marriage, the births of her first two children, and her spiritual journey.

Brave Miss World premiered on Israeli television in 2013, to positive reviews and public reception, and was screened at multiple film festivals in the United States and Europe throughout 2013 and 2014. The film was nominated for a Primetime Emmy for Outstanding Documentary Film.

=== LYA fashion label ===
In 2017, together with her friend, businesswoman Yafit Attias, Abargil launched a fashion label aimed to serve the modesty needs of religious women. They named the line LYA, an amalgam of the initials of both women.

=== Speech at the special UN session ===
In December 2023, Linor spoke at a special event in United Nations, focusing on Sexual and gender-based violence in the October 7 attacks, 2023. Linor sharply condemned international women's organizations for their silence on October 7 sexual assaults, stressing the need to amplify the victims' voices.

== Personal life ==
Abargil married Lithuanian basketball player Šarūnas Jasikevičius in a ceremony near Barcelona, in July 2006. They divorced in 2008. In 2010, Abargil married manager Oron Calfon, and embraced Orthodox Judaism. In 2012, she gave birth to twins (a son and a daughter), and in 2013, she gave birth to a daughter. She gave birth to another daughter in September 2019. Abargil earned an undergraduate law degree from Netanya Academic College, and was admitted to the Israeli Bar.

Awards and achievements
Preceded by (India) Diana Hayden	Miss World; 1998	Succeeded by (India) Yukta Mookhey
Preceded by (Turkey) Çağla Şikel	Miss World Europe; 1998	Succeeded by (Israel) Jenny Chervoney
