= Seduced: Inside the NXIVM Cult =

2020 American documentary miniseries

- Genre: Documentary
- Written by: Cecilia Peck; Inbal B. Lessner
- Directed by: Cecilia Peck
- Music by: Daniel Lessner
- Country of origin: United States
- Original language: English
- No. of episodes: 4

Production
- Executive producers: Cecilia Peck; Inbal B. Lessner; India Oxenberg; Daniel Voll; Alexandra Milchan
- Cinematography: Arlene Nelson
- Editors: Caitlin Dixon; Inbal B. Lessner; Matthew Moul; Gillian McCarthy; Christy Denes; Chris A. Peterson; Alex Jablonski
- Running time: 54-80 minutes
- Production company: Lionsgate Television

Original release
- Network: Starz
- Release: October 18 – November 8, 2020

Seduced: Inside the NXIVM Cult is an American true crime documentary television miniseries revolving around the cult NXIVM and its leader Keith Raniere, with a focus on the perspective of India Oxenberg, who was an executive producer on the series. It consists of four episodes and premiered on October 18, 2020, on Starz.

== Premise ==
Seduced: Inside the NXIVM Cult follows India Oxenberg as she grapples to make sense of her experience within NXIVM, a self-help organization which turned out to be a cult, examining her own culpability and abuse brought on to her by its leader, Keith Raniere, and rebuilds her relationship with her mother, Catherine Oxenberg who desperately fought to rescue her daughter. Naomi Gibson, Debora Giannone, Kelly Thiel, Tabby Chapman, Ashley McClean, and Ana Cecilia, also appear in the series sharing their stories and experiences in the organization.

The series features interviews with cult experts Janja Lalich, Steve Hassan and Rick Alan Ross, Cult therapist and deprogrammers Rachel Bernstein and Christine Marie Katas, Lawyers and prosecutors for NXIVM including Neil Glazer, Moira Kim Penza, Anne Champion, and Marc Agnifilo, and journalist Jaclyn Cangro.

== Episodes ==
No.	Title	Directed by	Original release date	U.S. viewers (millions)
1	"Hooked"	Cecilia Peck	October 18, 2020	0.121
2	"Indoctrinated"	Cecilia Peck	October 25, 2020	0.166
3	"Enslaved"	Cecilia Peck	November 1, 2020	0.112
4	"Exposed"	Cecilia Peck	November 8, 2020	0.176

== Production ==
India Oxenberg was a former member of NXIVM, a self-help organization located in Albany, New York, run by Keith Raniere, which Oxenberg exited in 2018. Oxenberg initially turned down media requests, but after attending therapy, Oxenberg felt she had to speak out and share her story. Oxenberg met with filmmakers Cecilia Peck and Inbal B. Lessner, who were also recruited by NXIVM, and decided to participate in the project. Oxenberg previously decided not to participate in The Vow as she was not ready to share her story, and did not see the project as a competition, nor did Peck and Lessner.

Peck was targeted for recruitment by a coworker from a previous project, who sent her e-mails informing her of an "incredible women's group" and suggested she meet with Allison Mack. Peck never responded to the e-mails, and a year later received an apology from the recruiter stating: "I’m so sorry. I was in a cult and I didn’t know it." Due to the sensitive subject matter, a fund was created for participants to have access to counseling and therapy services before, during, and after filming.

In 2021, Marc Elliot sued Starz and Lion's Gate for $12 million, claiming that the show libelled and defamed him. The lawsuit was dismissed in November 2022.

== Reception ==
=== Critical reception ===
On Rotten Tomatoes, the series holds an approval rating of 100% based on 11 reviews, with an average rating of 7.5/10. The website's critical consensus reads, "With compelling firsthand accounts and plenty of expert insights, Seduced is harrowing account of the startling ease with which a cult can consume a person's life."

=== Ratings ===
Viewership and ratings per episode of Seduced: Inside the NXIVM Cult
No.	Title	Air date	Rating (18–49)	Viewers (millions)	DVR (18–49)	DVR viewers (millions)	Total (18–49)	Total viewers (millions)
1	"Hooked"	October 18, 2020	0.01	0.121	TBD	TBD	TBD	TBD
2	"Indoctrinated"	October 25, 2020	0.03	0.166	TBD	TBD	TBD	TBD
3	"Enslaved"	November 1, 2020	0.02	0.112	TBD	TBD	TBD	TBD
4	"Exposed"	November 8, 2020	0.03	0.176	TBD	TBD	TBD	TBD

=== Accolades ===
Year	Award	Category	Nominees	Result	Ref.
2021	American Cinema Editors	Best Edited Documentary - Non-Theatrical	Inbal B. Lessner, Alex Jablonski, Gillian McCarthy, Matthew Moul and Chris A. Peterson	Nominated	

== See also ==
- Escaping the NXIVM Cult: A Mother's Fight to Save Her Daughter
- The Vow
