= Twin Flames Universe =

American religious organization

- Type: Privately held company
- Founded: 2017; 9 years ago
- Headquarters: United States
- Key people: Jeff Divine (co-founder); Shaleia Divine (co-founder)
- Website: twinflamesuniverse.com

Twin Flames Universe (TFU) is an American religious organization run by Jeff and Shaleia Divine. The group's practices are based on elements of New Age spiritualism focusing on soulmates, popularized in the 2000s. The group has been described as a cult by ex-members, with sociologist Janja Lalich describing it as "fit[ing] into a constellation of self-help and wellness cults that sell sweeping answers to life's biggest problems, and disguise thought reform and manipulation practices as therapy". Twin Flames Universe has been accused of exploiting followers, including inducing them to take expensive courses and do unpaid labor for the organization, as well as allegedly coercing some members to change their gender. In 2023, the group was the subject of the documentaries Desperately Seeking Soulmate: Escaping Twin Flames Universe and Escaping Twin Flames.

== Background ==
The term "twin flame" was coined by English novelist Marie Corelli in her 1886 novel A Romance of Two Worlds. Related terms, such as "twin rays", came into use in the early 20th century through Guy and Edna Ballard, founders of "I AM" Activity. A follower of the Ballards, American spiritualist Elizabeth Clare Prophet first popularized the contemporary concept of twin flames in her 1999 book Soul Mates and Twin Flames: The Spiritual Dimension of Love and Relationships. In it, Prophet mixes Hindu, Buddhist, and evangelical Christian beliefs to argue that twin flames are two people with a permanent divine connection required for both to reach enlightenment or salvation. Prophet's daughter, a professor of religion at the University of Florida, has argued that earlier variations of the concept appear in the works of Charles Fourier and Emanuel Swedenborg.

Since Prophet's popularization of the term, it has been used on some New Age spiritualism forums, where even more esoteric versions of the concept have developed. The term has been used to describe two people who are equals and whose purpose is to guide the other in their journey of self-discovery. Much like the idea of soulmates, one has no control over who one's twin flame is, and usually, the twin flame reflects one's own personality. The infatuation with twin flames has led to some unhealthy and problematic behaviors.

== Leaders ==
Jeffrey "Jeff" Divine (born Jeffrey Ayan; formerly Ender Ayanethos) grew up in Lapeer, Michigan, in a Catholic family. A childhood friend told Vice News that in his younger years, Jeff focused on learning everything he could about Warren Buffett. In high school, he was on the swim team and in theatre club. He graduated from Western Michigan University's business school in 2010 and then sold all his belongings and moved to a subsistence farm in California. In 2012, he moved to Hawaii, changed his name on social media to Ender Ayanethos (in reference to Ender's Game), and started the blog EndersAdventures. He built a shack in Hilo, Hawaii, which he rented on Airbnb. In 2012, he met Megan Plante online, and the pair started dating. In 2014, Jeff and Plante met for the first time in person and recorded their first video together. The couple married in 2016 and have a daughter, born in April 2023.

Shaleia Divine (/ʃəˈliə/ shə-LEE-ə; born Megan Plante; formerly Shaleia Ayan) was born and raised in Canada in a Catholic family. Before meeting Ayan, she was a photography student, reiki practitioner, and psychic who worked at a Thai restaurant. Shortly after beginning to date Ayan, she changed her name to Shaleia on the advice of her 'spiritual teacher' Altonah Lampe.

== History ==
When Jeff and Shaleia met, Shaleia was living in Arizona, where Jeff joined her. The two then moved to Hawaii, started a blog called Awakened Intimacy, and began making YouTube videos in 2014. As of July 2025, their YouTube channel had amassed 28,000 subscribers, and their Facebook page had 369,000 followers. They founded Twin Flames Universe in 2017 and began offering the "Twin Flame Ascension Course", a paid online class. Vanity Fair journalist Alice Hines described the classes as "a therapeutic-spiritual reality show"; in 2020, the course cost $4,444 to view and purchase. In 2019, the couple founded the Church of Union, to "unify all religion under one spiritual umbrella". Followers are allegedly put under strong pressure to pay for expensive courses and to engage in extensive unpaid labor for the organisation. Within the church, Jeff is the "Father Christ", Shaleia the "Mother Christ", and their daughter the "Princess of all Creation". Together, they are "the Master Christ: Eternal Ruler of all Creation by God's Living Hand". They also run the "Mind Alignment Process", an online service that claims to treat PTSD. The couple has also claimed the ability to cure cancer and other medical conditions with a form of spiritual therapy. Since 2020, the organization has been headquartered south of Suttons Bay, Michigan. It has been estimated that at least 80% of the people who watch the group's YouTube videos are women.

After the release of two television documentary series about the group in 2023, they hired Red Banyan, a crisis communications firm, to improve their image. In 2025, the Michigan Attorney General's office confirmed there was an open investigation into the group. On July 1, 2025, Michigan Attorney General Dana Nessel announced that authorities had raided two properties linked to Twin Flames and that there was an ongoing criminal probe against Jeff and Shaleia Divine.

== Teachings ==
The group teaches that everyone has a "twin flame", an intense variation of a soulmate, which Jeff and Shaleia will assign, and the member is encouraged to pursue their "twin flame" romantically. The group initially allowed outsiders to be assigned as twin flames, leading to instances of members facing restraining orders and criminal charges for stalking. Members of the group are encouraged to engage in the "mirror exercise", which requires one to think of what is bothering them and then blame themselves for it. Sociologist Janja Lalich has described it as "this kind of introspective exercise, which they say is there to help you, but it's actually there to tear apart the self".

The group teaches the concepts of a "Divine Masculine" and "Divine Feminine" and that every partnership has one masculine and one feminine partner. Former members have criticized the group for doing a form of conversion therapy by exerting social pressure on members to conform to their "divine" assigned gender identity. Former member Arcelia Francis compared the group's ideology to what might happen "if excessive liberal progressives got drunk and had a baby with conservative Christians". Other members have mentioned being assigned a twin flame who wasn't the gender they were attracted to; Jeff and Shaleia claimed they had confirmed their genders through God. Many of these people have changed their pronouns, their hairstyles, wardrobes, names, and more about their physical appearance. A few went so far as to medically transition to new genders, under the guidance of Jeff and Shaleia. It has been hypothesised that this was done to make matches easier among the majority-women membership of the group. The group claims to be supportive of the LGBT community, but its rhetoric has been criticized by the New School professor Cassius Adair, who has said, "What I'm hearing them say is, 'I want to get closer to who I'm supposed to be.' That raises a red flag for me... We don't want there to be a 'supposed to be' about gender. We want gender to be something that you are allowed to discern on your own."

Jeff Divine has been accused of behaving abusively toward members and toward Shaleia. It is alleged that he demands that followers cut off their families, that they treat people outside of the Twin Flames community as untrustworthy, and that he implements a strict regimen for their daily routine.

The conservative, Christian organization Focus on the Family has criticized the Divines for operating a cult with "a New Age take on the Prosperity Gospel" that is "two deeply flawed human beings preaching a patchwork of New Age beliefs for their personal gain".

In response, Twin Flames Universe has said: "The allegations levied against Twin Flames Universe not only distort our true aims, methods, and curriculums but also misrepresent the autonomy of our community members, who are free to engage with our resources as they see fit. We are committed to confronting these allegations in an open and accountable manner."

== In media ==
In 2020, Vanity Fair journalist Alice Hines became the first reporter to meet and interview the leaders of Twin Flames Universe in person. The group is the focus of the documentaries Desperately Seeking Soulmate: Escaping Twin Flames Universe (2023) and Escaping Twin Flames (2023).

CTV's W5 program aired a documentary about Twin Flames, titled We're Not a Cult: Inside Twin Flames Universe, on March 22, 2025, which included interviews with the leaders, other high-ranking members, former members, and whistleblowers. Conducted by investigative reporter Avery Haines, it was the Divines' first on-camera interview with a major news outlet.
