= Cecilia Peck =

American actress and director

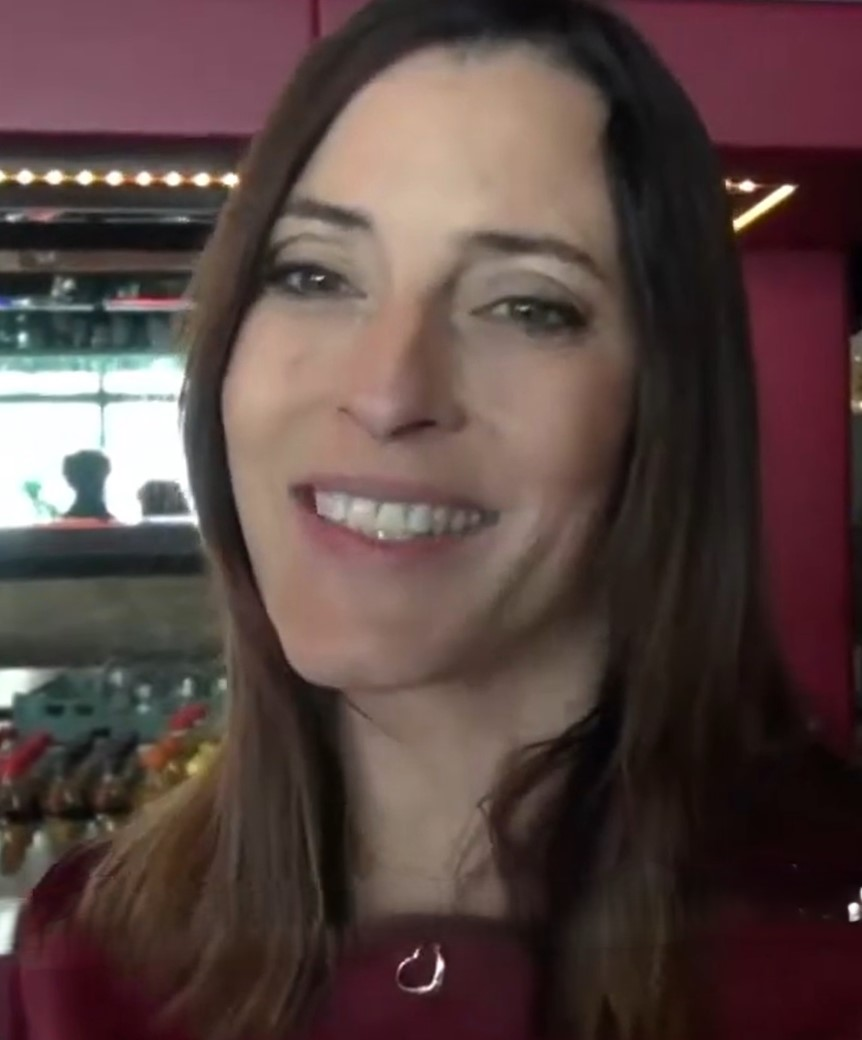
- Peck in 2018
- Born: May 1, 1958 (age 68); Los Angeles, California, U.S.
- Education: Princeton University
- Occupations: Producer, director, actress
- Years active: 1986–present
- Spouse: Daniel Voll (m. 2001)
- Children: 2
- Parent(s): Gregory Peck; Veronique Passani
- Relatives: Ethan Peck (nephew)

Cecilia Alexandra Peck (born May 1, 1958) is an American film producer, director and actress. She is the younger of two children of actor Gregory Peck and his second wife Veronique Passani.

== Career ==
As an actress, Peck was nominated for the Golden Globe Award for The Portrait, in which she played the daughter of her father's character. She played the leading role in Torn Apart, and appeared in My Best Friend Is a Vampire. Peck produced A Conversation with Gregory Peck, about her father, which premiered as a Special Selection in the 2000 Cannes Film Festival, and aired on TCM and PBS American Masters. She directed and produced the documentary short Justice For All, an examination of capital punishment, which was awarded the Silver Gavel Award. She was an associate producer on Defending Our Daughters, a non-fiction film about women's human rights for Lifetime Television, which was awarded the Voices of Courage Award by the Women's Refugee Committee. Since 2008, Peck and her family have been presenting the Gregory Peck Award for Cinematic Excellence to actors and directors at the Dingle International Film Festival and, starting in 2014, at the San Diego International Film Festival. Peck has presented the award to Patrick Stewart, Keith Carradine and Laurence Fishburne.

Peck directed and produced Shut Up & Sing, about the backlash against the Dixie Chicks for opposing the Iraq War. The film premiered at the Toronto International Film Festival, won a Special Jury Prize at the Chicago Film Festival, Best Documentary at the Sydney, Aspen, and Woodstock Film Festivals, and was shortlisted for the 2007 Academy Awards. Peck directed and produced the feature documentary Brave Miss World (Netflix), following Linor Abargil's fight for justice and mission to break the silence around rape. The film was nominated for the Emmy Award for Exceptional Merit In Documentary Filmmaking in 2014. Peck's company, "Rocket Girl Productions", produces independent feature films and documentaries. In 2018, Peck joined the board of directors of the San Diego International Film Festival.

In 2020, Peck directed Seduced: Inside the NXIVM Cult which follows India Oxenberg and other women who shared their experiences in NXIVM, a self-help organization located in Albany, New York. Prior to working on the documentary, Peck was targeted for recruitment by NXIVM. A previous co-worker had reached out to Peck to inform her of an incredible women's group and suggest she meet with Allison Mack, one of its leaders and recruiters. Peck never responded to the emails, and a year later, received an e-mail from the recruiter apologizing. Peck was a director, writer and executive producer of the 2020 four part documentary series Seduced: Inside the NXIVM cult. In March 2021, Peck gifted clothes and loaned personal items to create the exhibition "From Paris To Hollywood, the Fashion and Influence of Véronique and Gregory Peck." This exhibit is located at the Denver Art Museum. In 2023, Peck directed and produced Escaping Twin Flames, focusing on the Twin Flames Universe cult founded by Jeff and Shaleia Divine, through the perspective of former members for Netflix.

== Personal life ==
Peck married writer Daniel Voll on September 8, 2001. They have two children. Their son Harper Daniel Peck, born in 1999, is named after Harper Lee. Their daughter Ondine Peck-Voll was born in 2002. Peck is the former sister-in-law of supermodel Cheryl Tiegs, and aunt of actor Ethan Peck. She holds dual citizenship in the US and France, and speaks French.

== Filmography ==
=== Actress ===
- 1986: Dress Gray (TV)
- 1987: Wall Street
- 1988: Crime Story (Guest star, 2 episodes)
- 1988: My Best Friend Is a Vampire
- 1990: Torn Apart
- 1991: Ambition
- 1992: Tous mes maris (TV)
- 1993: Blue Flame
- 1993: The Portrait (TV)
- 1994: Killing Zoe
- 1994: Renegade (Guest star, 1 episode)
- 1995: French Exit
- 1997: Sous les pieds des femmes
- 2005: Havoc

=== Director ===
- 2006: Shut Up & Sing
- 2013: Brave Miss World
- 2020: Seduced: Inside the NXIVM Cult
- 2023: Escaping Twin Flames

=== Producer ===
- 1999: A Conversation With Gregory Peck
- 2002: The Hamptons (TV)
- 2006: Shut Up & Sing
- 2013: Brave Miss World
