= Veronique Peck =

French-American arts patron, philanthropist, and journalist (1932–2012)

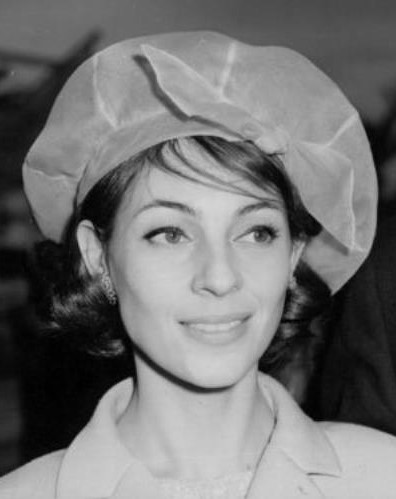
- Peck in 1963
- Born: Veronique Passani; February 5, 1932; Paris, France
- Died: August 17, 2012 (aged 80); Los Angeles, California, U.S.
- Occupations: Arts patron, philanthropist, journalist
- Spouse: Gregory Peck (m. 1955; died 2003)
- Children: 2, including Cecilia Peck

Veronique Peck (née Véronique Passani; February 5, 1932 – August 17, 2012) was a French-American arts patron, philanthropist, and journalist. She was married to actor Gregory Peck from 1955 until his death in 2003.

== Life and career ==
Veronique Passani was born in Paris; her mother was an artist and writer, while her father was an architect. She began her career as a journalist for France Soir, a French daily newspaper, and met Gregory Peck while conducting an interview for France Soir in 1952. The couple married on December 31, 1955, one day after Peck's divorce from his first wife, Greta Kukkonen.

Peck became a well-known philanthropist in Greater Los Angeles. She and her husband raised approximately $50 million for the American Cancer Society during the 1960s. The Los Angeles Times named her "Woman of the Year" in 1967. She also co-founded the Inner City Cultural Center, a theater group composed of members from different ethnic backgrounds, and the Los Angeles Music Center. Peck became a naturalized U.S. citizen in 1976.

Shortly after Gregory Peck's death in 2003, Peck took control of the Gregory Peck Reading Series. The series raises money on behalf of the Los Angeles Public Library through the collaboration of celebrities. She had become friends with author Harper Lee while her husband was filming To Kill a Mockingbird. In 2005, Peck convinced the normally reclusive Lee to accept the Los Angeles Public Library Literary Award in person. Peck and her family attended a private White House screening of To Kill a Mockingbird in 2012 with President Barack Obama to mark what would have been her late husband's 96th birthday.

== Death ==
Veronique Peck died of a heart ailment at her Los Angeles home on August 17, 2012, at age 80.
