= Soulmate =

Person with a unique bond

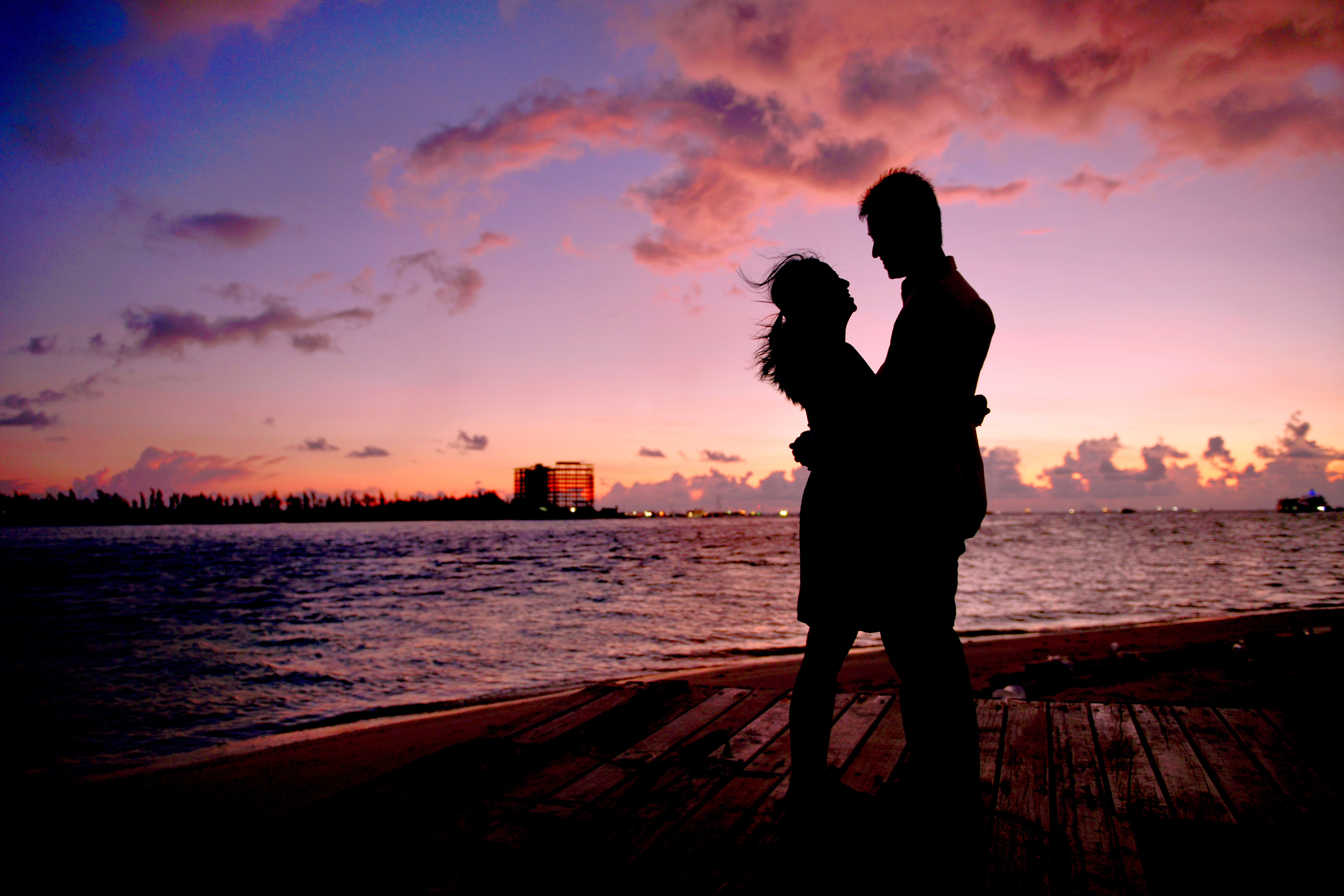

A soulmate is a person with whom one feels a deep affinity or unique connection. It commonly holds the connotation of being the strongest bond that one can achieve with another person. This affinity may involve similarity, love, romance, comfort, intimacy, sexuality, sexual activity, spirituality, compatibility, and trust. People who believe in soulmates commonly accept that one will feel "complete" once they have found their soulmate, as it is partially in the perceived definition that two souls are meant to unite.

In social science, a model titled the "soulmate model" exists. It is defined as relationships where one perfect person is designed to complete the subject romantically.

The earliest recorded use of the term soulmate in the English language appeared in a letter by Samuel Taylor Coleridge, in 1822.

== Historical usage ==
=== Greek mythology ===
The Western idea that one is incomplete until they find their soulmate (or other half) has an early account in a Greek legend told in Plato's Symposium. In the dialogue, Plato has Aristophanes present an idea that humans originally had four arms, four legs, and two faces. Then, as a punishment for pride, Zeus cut these creatures in half, leaving them incomplete and each yearning for reunion with its missing counterpart. Aristophanes says:

Love is born into every human being: it calls back the halves of our original nature together; it tries to make one out of two and heal the wound of human nature. Each of us, then, is a 'matching half' of a human whole, because each was sliced like a flatfish, two out of one, and each of us is always seeking the half that matches him. [...] And so, when a person meets the half that is his very own, [...] the two are struck from their senses by love, by a sense of belonging to one another, and by desire, and they don't want to be separated from one another, not even for a moment. These are people who finish out their lives together and still cannot say what it is they want from one another.

The origin of the soulmate idea has been attributed to this myth found in the Symposium, while Irving Singer has also stated that Aristophanes may have inherited it from the Orphic mysteries, or Hindu, Babylonian, or other sources. Singer also states that despite how basic the speech is to idealism about love, it was meant to be ironic; Aristophanes is not a spokesperson for Plato. Plato instead speaks through Socrates, who depicts love as the knowledge of absolute beauty.

=== Judaism ===
In Judaism, bashert means destined or intended. This term can refer to any destined incident and is particularly used for one's soulmate. According to the Talmud, it is said that forty days before a male child is formed, a voice from heaven announces whose daughter he is going to marry. Similar to the myth by Plato, the 13th-century scholar Nachmanides said that God splits a soul in two halves before birth, to be later reunited in marriage. Baal Shem Tov once said, "From every human being there rises a light that reaches straight to heaven, and when two souls that are destined to be together find each other, the streams of light flow together and a single brighter light goes forth from that united being."

Prayer has been regarded as a means of seeking one's bashert. A group of women in California also recited select Psalms (31, 32, 70, 72, and 124) for forty days, suggested by an Israeli mystic rabbi.

=== Hinduism ===
The story of Shiva and Parvati (Shakti) illustrates how the masculine and feminine principles are eternal and inseparable parts of the universe. The story of Radha and Krishna also illustrates divine love that breaks through all barriers.

=== New Age ===
Mark L. Prophet and Elizabeth Clare Prophet define a soulmate as a separate entity with whom an individual has shared many lifetimes, whether as a friend, lover, co-worker, or partner. Typically, the individual is drawn to this entity to complete a specific mission. They describe a soulmate as one of many potential spiritual brothers or sisters: "Even though there may be a great attraction and bond between soulmates, fundamentally, in the ultimate sense, you could define it more as a brother/sister relationship, even though soulmates have great marriages and a great union of hearts." According to Mark Prophet: "A soulmate relationship has to do with the seat of the soul Chandra, that Chandra just above the base ... The connection is one of parallel and mutual evolution rather than origin."

== Criticism ==
Research has shown that expecting to find a soulmate can lead to dysfunction. This is because people with such a belief have a "destiny mindset" which makes them more likely to doubt their relationships and end them. In contrast to this, having a "growth mindset" is associated with working on solutions to relationship problems. These destiny beliefs have a greater association between satisfaction and relationship length, while growth beliefs are associated with longer relationships.

The "soulmate model of relationships" is a valid model of relationships posited by social science researchers, defined by the belief that there is one perfect person designed to complete the subject romantically. It "places a premium on each partner's innermost needs or desires, that is, on their sense that a relationship is delivering the emotional and sexual intimacy that affords them a sense of personal fulfillment." However, the soulmate model has been criticized by the institutional model of marriage, which is defined by more objective and goal-oriented marital partnerships, characterized by marital permanency, mutual aid to one another, and the tasks around childbearing and childrearing. Social networks of friends and family who view their marriages in a similar regard are also factors, along with religious institutions that lend ritual power to their relationship. Researchers have found that institutional models of marriage are more likely to enjoy more stable marriages than those who base their marriage on the soulmate approach.

== See also ==
- Astrological compatibility
- Red thread of fate
- Twin flame
