= Daniel Lessner =

American composer and virtuoso pianist

Daniel Lessner is an American composer and virtuoso pianist currently based in Los Angeles.

== Biography ==
Daniel Lessner began his piano studies at the age of four in Miami, Florida. He played his first recital at eleven, and by the age of eighteen he had won over a hundred local and national performance competitions. He entered the Juilliard School of Music in New York city on scholarship to study with the renowned teacher Adele Marcus, and while there won the Tchaikovsky Concerto Competition which he performed at Lincoln Center under the baton of Massimo Freccia. After receiving his bachelor's and master's degrees in music from Juilliard, Mr. Lessner was chosen as a candidate for the school's doctoral program, and he remained there on faculty for two seasons after finishing his PHD.

Daniel has performed in both solo and orchestral concerts around the world in four continents, including performances in New York's Carnegie Hall, and The Disney Concert Hall in Los Angeles where he played Rachmaninoff's Variations on a Theme by Paganini. He has performed the Rachmaninoff Piano Concerto No. 3, the Franz Liszt piano arrangement of Richard Wagner's Tannhauser Overture, Brahms Variations on a Theme by Paganini, Bach's Goldberg Variations, and the French Suite No. 6. He can currently be heard in the Clio Award winning United Airlines advertising campaign, featuring his performances of Gershwin's Rhapsody in Blue.

In addition to performing, Daniel composes music for film and television in Hollywood. His composition clients have included themes for Carsey Warner Television, ABC sports, HBO's Inside The NFL, ESPN, and the USA Network. In 2006, Mr. Lessner formed the music production and recording studio SKANDA MUSIC with fellow composer William Richter of the Berklee College of Music. Their work together has included film scores, broadcast game show themes for the NBA Phoenix Suns and MLB's Tampa Bay Rays, commercials, music for The Museum of Terror, and the History Channel series That's Impossible.

Daniel Lessner has worked as a producer and as an artist and Repertoire Representative for EMI Records. He has been a professor of piano at USC's Thornton School of Music.

== Filmography (as Composer) ==
2009

- That's Impossible (TV Series)
- A Secret At Arrow Lake

2008

- That Which Is Within
- Columbus Day (additional music)

2006

- A.W.O.L.
- Close to Home Season 2 (TV additional music)
