= Gregory Peck =

American actor (1916–2003)

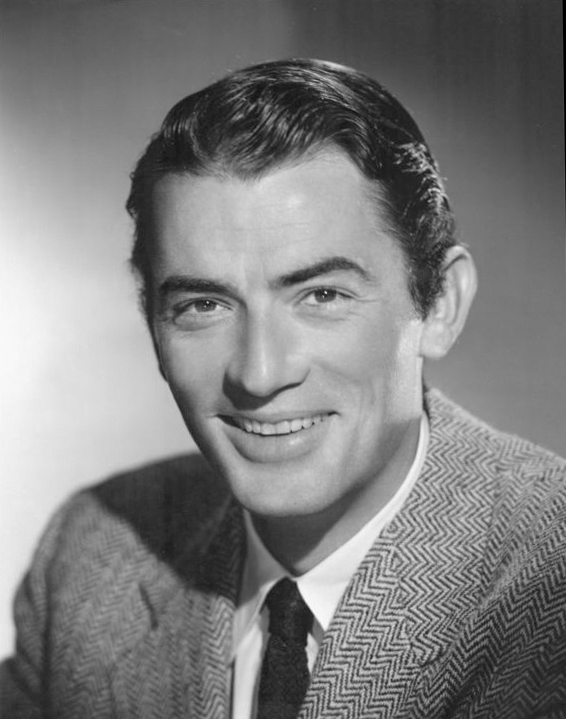
- Peck in 1948
- Born: Eldred Gregory Peck; April 5, 1916; San Diego, California, U.S.
- Died: June 12, 2003 (aged 87); Los Angeles, California, U.S.
- Resting place: Cathedral of Our Lady of the Angels, Los Angeles
- Occupation: Actor
- Years active: 1939–2000
- Political party: Democratic
- Spouses: Greta Kukkonen (m. 1942; div. 1955) Veronique Passani (m. 1955)
- Children: 5, including Cecilia
- Relatives: Ethan Peck (grandson)
- Website: gregorypeck.com

Eldred Gregory Peck (April 5, 1916 – June 12, 2003) was an American actor. He was one of the most popular film stars from the 1940s to the 1970s. In 1999, the American Film Institute named Peck the 12th-greatest male star of Classic Hollywood Cinema.

After studying at the Neighborhood Playhouse with Sanford Meisner, Peck began appearing in stage productions, acting in more than 50 plays and three Broadway productions. He first gained critical success in The Keys of the Kingdom (1944), a John M. Stahl–directed drama that earned him his first Academy Award nomination. He starred in a series of successful films, including romantic-drama The Valley of Decision (1945), Alfred Hitchcock's Spellbound (1945) and family film The Yearling (1946). He encountered lukewarm commercial reviews at the end of the 1940s, his performances including The Paradine Case (1947) and The Great Sinner (1948). Peck reached global recognition in the 1950s and 1960s, appearing back-to-back in the book-to-film adaptation of Captain Horatio Hornblower (1951) and biblical drama David and Bathsheba (1951). He starred alongside Ava Gardner in The Snows of Kilimanjaro (1952) and Audrey Hepburn in Roman Holiday (1953).

Other notable films in which he appeared include Moby Dick (1956, and its 1998 mini-series), The Guns of Navarone (1961), Cape Fear (1962, and its 1991 remake), The Omen (1976) and The Boys from Brazil (1978). Throughout his career he often portrayed protagonists with "moral fiber". Gentleman's Agreement (1947) centered on topics of antisemitism, whilst Peck's character in Twelve O'Clock High (1949) dealt with the challenges of military leadership and post-traumatic stress disorder during World War II. He won the Academy Award for Best Actor for his performance as Atticus Finch in To Kill a Mockingbird (1962), an adaptation of the novel of the same name, which revolved around racial inequality, for which he received acclaim. In 1983 he starred opposite Christopher Plummer in The Scarlet and The Black as Hugh O'Flaherty, a Catholic priest who saved thousands of escaped Allied POWs and Jewish people in Rome during the Second World War.

Peck was also active in politics, challenging the House Un-American Activities Committee in 1947, and was regarded as a political opponent by Richard Nixon. Lyndon B. Johnson honored Peck with the Presidential Medal of Freedom in 1969 for his lifetime humanitarian efforts. Peck died in his sleep from bronchopneumonia at the age of 87.

== Early life ==
Eldred Gregory Peck was born on April 5, 1916, in the neighborhood of La Jolla in San Diego, California, to Bernice Mae "Bunny" (née Ayres; 1894–1992), and Gregory Pearl Peck (1886–1962), a Rochester, New York–born chemist and pharmacist. His father was of English (paternal) and Irish (maternal) heritage, and his mother was of English and Scots ancestry. She converted to her husband's religion, Catholicism, and Peck was raised as a Catholic. Through his Irish-born paternal grandmother, Catherine Ashe (1864–1926), Peck was related to Thomas Ashe (1885–1917), who participated in the Easter Rising less than three weeks after Peck's birth and died while being force-fed during a hunger strike in 1917.

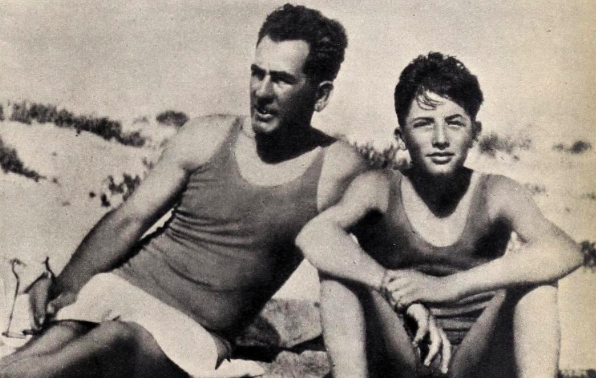
Peck (right) with his father, c. 1930

Peck's parents divorced when he was five and he was brought up by his maternal grandmother, who took him to the movies every week. At the age of 10 he was sent to a Catholic military school, St John's Military Academy in Los Angeles. While he was there his grandmother died. At 14 he moved back to San Diego to live with his father. He attended San Diego High School, and after graduating in 1934 enrolled for one year at San Diego State Teachers’ College (now known as San Diego State University). While there he joined the track team, took his first theatre and public-speaking courses and pledged the Epsilon Eta fraternity. Peck had ambitions to be a doctor and later transferred to the University of California, Berkeley, as an English major and pre-medical student. Standing at 6 ft 3 in (1.91 m), he rowed on the university crew. Although his tuition fee was only $26 per year, Peck still struggled to pay and took a job as a "hasher" (kitchen helper) for the Alpha Gamma Delta sorority in exchange for meals.

At Berkeley, Peck's deep, well-modulated voice gained him attention, and after participating in a public speaking course he decided to try acting. He was encouraged by an acting coach, who saw in him perfect material for university theatre, and he became more and more interested in performing. He was recruited by Edwin Duerr, director of the university's Little Theater, and appeared in five plays during his senior year, including as Starbuck in Moby Dick. Peck later said about his years at Berkeley that "it was a very special experience for me and three of the greatest years of my life. It woke me up and made me a human being." In 1996 Peck donated $25,000 to the Berkeley rowing crew in honor of his coach, Ky Ebright.

== Career ==
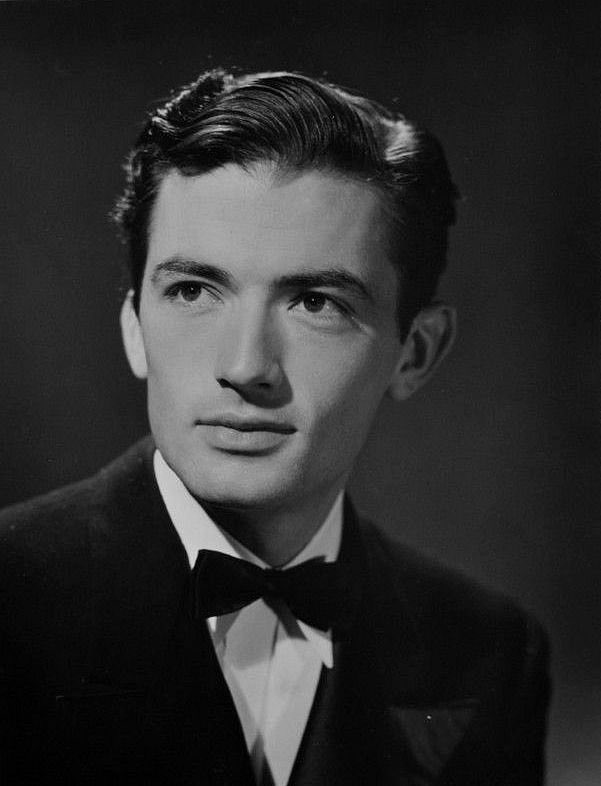
Gregory Peck in 1939

=== 1939–1943: Beginnings and stage roles ===
Peck did not graduate with his friends because he lacked one course. His college friends were concerned for him and wondered how he would get along without his degree. "I have all I need from the university," he told them. Peck dropped the name Eldred and headed to New York City to study at the Neighborhood Playhouse with the legendary acting teacher Sanford Meisner. He was often broke and sometimes slept in Central Park. He worked at the 1939 World's Fair as a barker, at Rockefeller Center as a tour guide for NBC television and at Radio City Music Hall. Before 1940 he dabbled in modeling and worked in exchange for food at the Barter Theatre in Abingdon, Virginia, where he appeared in five plays, including Family Portrait and On Earth As It Is.

His stage career began in 1941 when he played the secretary in a Katharine Cornell production of George Bernard Shaw's play The Doctor's Dilemma. The play opened in San Francisco just one week before the attack on Pearl Harbor. He made his Broadway debut as the lead in Emlyn Williams' The Morning Star in 1942. His second Broadway performance that year was in The Willow and I with Edward Pawley. Peck's acting abilities were in high demand during World War II since he had been exempted from military service because of a back injury suffered while receiving dance and movement lessons from Martha Graham as part of his acting training. Twentieth Century Fox later claimed he had injured his back while rowing in college, but in Peck's words, "In Hollywood, they didn't think a dance class was macho enough, I guess. I've been trying to straighten out that story for years." Peck performed in a total of 50 plays, including three short-lived Broadway productions, 4–5 road tours, and summer theater.

=== 1944–1946: Hollywood breakthrough ===
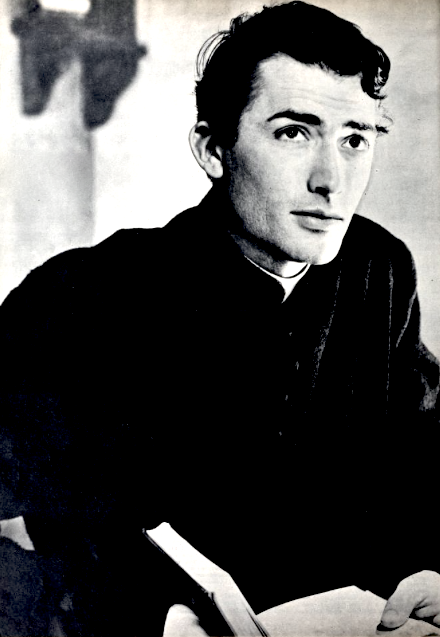
Peck in the film The Keys of the Kingdom (1944)

After gaining stage recognition, Peck was offered his first film role at RKO Radio Pictures, the male lead in the war-romance Days of Glory (1944), directed by Jacques Tourneur, alongside top-billed Tamara Toumanova, a Russian-born ballerina. Peck portrayed the leader of Russian guerrillas resisting the Germans in 1941 who stumble across a beautiful Russian dancer (Toumanova), who had been sent to entertain Russian troops; they protect her by letting her join their group. During production of the film, Tourneur "untrained" Peck from his theater training where he was used to speaking in a formal manner and projecting his voice to the entire hall. Peck considered his performance in the film as quite amateurish and did not wish to watch the film after it was released. The film lost money at the box office, disappeared from theaters quickly, and was largely dismissed by critics.

At the time of the film's release, critic Bosley Crowther of The New York Times assessed it as slow-moving and verbose, adding that Peck's acting was stiff. (Note: Crowther said, "Gregory Peck comes recommended with a Gary Cooper angularity and a face somewhat like that modest gentleman's, but his acting is equally stiff.") Film historian Barry Monush has written, "Peck's star power was evident from the word go." Following the release of the film, Peck gained the attention of producers, but rather than participate in the studio system, he decided to remain a freelancer with the ability to choose his roles, signing non-exclusive contracts with four studios, including an unusual dual contract with 20th Century Fox and Gone With the Wind producer David O. Selznick.

In Peck's second movie, The Keys of the Kingdom (1944), he played an 80-year-old Roman Catholic priest who looks back at his undertakings during over half a century of his determined, self-sacrificing missionary work in China. The film shows the character aging from his 20s to 80; Peck was featured in almost every scene. The film was nominated for four Academy Awards, including the Academy Award for Best Actor, which was Peck's first nomination. Although the film finished only 27th at the box office in North America for 1944, Jay Carr of Turner Classic Movies refers to it as Peck's breakthrough performance, while writer Patrick McGilligan says that it "catapulted him to stardom". At the time of release, Peck's performance was lauded by Variety and The New York Times, despite mixed reviews for the film itself. (Note: Variety described the movie as "a cavalcade of a priest's life, played excellently by Peck, what transcends all the cinematic action is the impact of tolerance, service, faith and godliness", Bosley Crowther of The New York Times wrote, "Much of the dialogue that is cautiously arranged between and among these people is tedious, since it lacks real depth or point", but Peck "gives a quiet and forceful performance.") The Radio Times referred to it as "a long, talkative and rather undramatic picture" but admitted that "its success saved Peck's career". Craig Butler of AllMovie states "he gives a commanding performance, full of his usual quiet dignity and intelligence, and spiked with stubbornness and an inner fire that make the character truly come alive".

In The Valley of Decision (1945), a romantic drama about intermingling social classes, Peck plays the eldest son of a wealthy steel mill owner in 1870s Pittsburgh who has a romance with one of his family's maids, portrayed by Greer Garson. who was nominated for the Academy Award for Best Actress. Upon release, reviews from The New York Times and Variety were somewhat positive, with Peck's performance described as commanding. (Note: Bosley Crowther wrote, "Peck's performance is "quietly commanding". Variety said the tale "is movingly dealt with" and that "Peck has the personality and ability to command attention in any scene.") It was North America's highest-grossing movie of 1945.

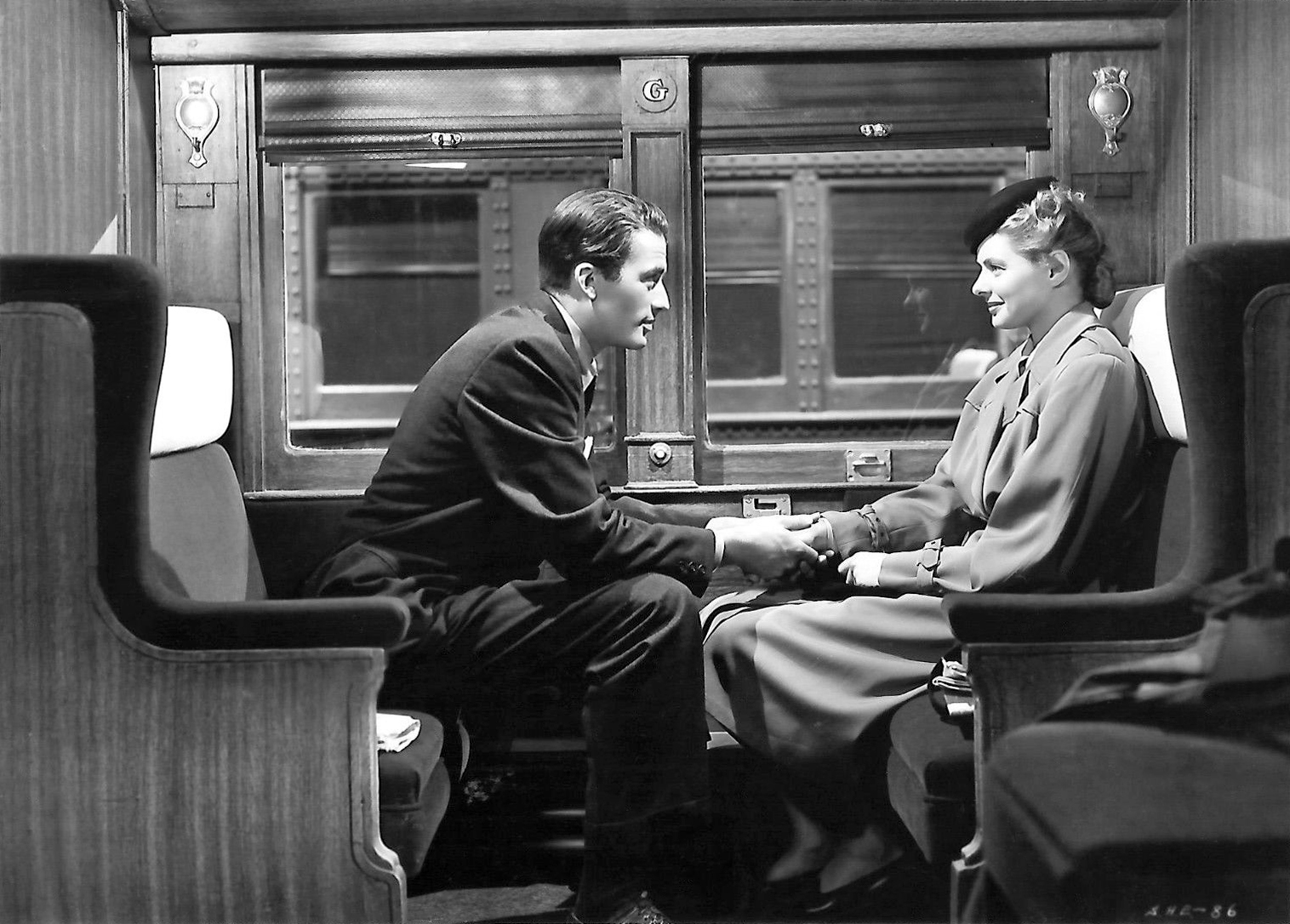
Peck and co-star Ingrid Bergman in the film Spellbound (1945)

Peck's next film was the first of two collaborations with director Alfred Hitchcock, the suspense-romance Spellbound (1945), opposite Ingrid Bergman. Peck plays a man who is thought to be the new director of the psychiatric facility where Bergman's character works as a psychoanalyst, while his amnesia and disturbing visions suggest he may be a murderer. Peck and Hitchcock were described as having a cordial but cool relationship. Hitchcock initially hoped that Cary Grant would play the male lead. Peck later stated that he thought he was too young when he first worked with Hitchcock and that the director's on-set indifference to his character's motivation, important to Peck's acting style, shook his confidence. Peck's chemistry clicked with his screen partner Bergman; the actors were romantically linked at the time.

Released at the end of 1945, Spellbound was a hit, ranking as the third-most successful film of 1946. Spellbound was well received by critics at the time, as was Peck's performance. (Note: Bosley Crowther of The New York Times said it is a "moving love story" and "a rare film", that "the manner and quality of story-telling is extraordinarily fine", "the firm texture of narration, the flow of continuity and dialogue, the shock of the unexpected, the scope of the image – all are happily here". Variety said: "Alfred Hitchcock handles his players and action in a suspenseful manner, and except for a few episodes of much scientific dialogue, maintains a steady pace in keeping the camera moving", adding that Peck "handles the suspense scenes with great skill".) Bosley Crowther of The New York Times praised the film, stating that Peck's performance "restrained and refined, is precisely the proper counter to Bergman's exquisite role"; Frank Miller of Turner Classic Movies has written that the movie accelerated the rise of Peck into a Hollywood star and even "a major sex symbol." Producer David O. Selznick noted that during preview tests of the movie, the women in the audiences had substantive reactions to the appearance of Peck's name during the opening credits, stating that during his first few scenes the audience had to be shushed to quiet down. Spellbound was nominated for six Academy Awards including Best Picture, although it was not in the National Board of Review's top ten films of the year.

In The Yearling (1946), Peck portrays a kind-hearted father, opposite onscreen wife, Jane Wyman, whose son finds and insists on raising a three-day-old fawn in 1870s Florida. Reviews upon release were very positive (Note: A.E. Wilson of The Star (UK) wrote, "the film is acted with rare perfection". Bosley Crowther also wrote, "The strong bond of trust and wistful longing which exists between the boy and his "Pa" required the most sensitive tuning in order to ring sharp and true" and "the love of the lad for a pet fawn, which his father understands, had to be tenderly developed to appear wholly genuine.") with Bosley Crowther evaluating it as a film that "provides a wealth of satisfaction that few films ever attain". The Yearling was a box office success, finishing with the ninth highest box office gross for 1947, and landed six Academy Award nominations, including Best Actor. Peck won the Golden Globe for Best Actor for performance. In recent decades, it has continued to receive critical praise (Note: It's been described as "exquisitely filmed...with memorable performances" by Leonard Maltin; by Dan Jardine of AllMovie as, "teetering on the brink of sentimentality at times" but "the honesty of the performances and the beauty of the photography procure a place for The Yearling in cinematic history. by Tom Hutchinson of Radio Times as a "lovely and loving story (which) takes its strength from an understatement of dramatic events and the underplaying of the actors. Veteran director Clarence Brown shapes it into a tale that touches the heart while never patronizing the mind. Sentiment without sentimentality.") with Barry Monush writing that it was "one of the best-made and most-loved family films of its day".

Peck took his first "against type" role, playing a cruel, amoral cowboy, in the Western soap opera Duel in the Sun (1946) with top-billed Jennifer Jones as the provocative temptress-object of Peck's love, anger, and desire. Their chemistry is described by film historian David Thomson as "a constant knife fight of sensuality". Joseph Cotten starred as Peck's righteous half brother and competitor for the affections of the "steamy, sexpot" character of Jones; the movie was resoundingly criticized and even banned in some cities due to its lurid nature. The publicity around the eroticism of Duel in the Sun, one of the biggest movie advertising campaigns in history, used a new tactic of opening in hundreds of theaters across the U.S. at once, saturating the theaters in cities where it opened, resulting in the film's being the second highest-grossing movie of both 1947 and all of the 1940s. Nicknamed "Lust in the Dust", the film received mostly negative reviews upon release- (Note: Frank Miller of Turner Classic Movies says it had "pretty awful reviews", and Stephen Watts of The Sunday Times said it "fluctuates between the repellent and the ridiculous". Variety wrote, "The familiar western formula reaches its highest commercialization...(the movie) is raw, sex-laden pulp fiction.... The vastness of western locale is splendidly displayed in color...too much at times considering the movie's length" and Jones and Peck overact in some scenes.) Bosley Crowther wrote that "performances are strangely uneven," although Jones received a nomination for the Academy Award for Best Actress. The opinions of Peck's performance have been polarized. (Note: David Parkinson of the BFI says, Peck "credibly holds his own against the scene-stealing veterans" in the movie; Bosley Crowther says Peck makes "the renegade brother a credibly vicious and lawless character"; but Christopher Tookey says "Peck is as lively as the average coffee table"; and Variety wrote that Peck overacted in some scenes.)

=== 1947–1949: Highs and lows ===
In 1947, Peck co-founded The La Jolla Playhouse at his birthplace with Mel Ferrer and Dorothy McGuire. This summer stock company presented productions in the La Jolla High School Auditorium from 1947 until 1964. In 1983, the La Jolla Playhouse re-opened in a new home at the University of California, San Diego, where it operates today. It has attracted Hollywood film stars on hiatus, both as performers and enthusiastic supporters, since its inception.

Peck's next release was the modest-budget, serious adult drama, The Macomber Affair (1947), in which he portrays an African hunting guide assisting a tourist couple. During the trip, the wife, played by Joan Bennett, becomes enamored with Peck, and the husband gets shot. Peck was very active in the development of the film, including recommending director Zoltan Korda. The film received positive reviews (Note: Bosley Crowther wrote, "[The movie is] a tight and absorbing study of character," and "the hunting scenes, incidentally, are visual knockouts" but, it has a "contrived conclusion...(that is) completely stupid and false;") but was mostly overlooked by the public upon its release, which Peck would later say disappointed him.

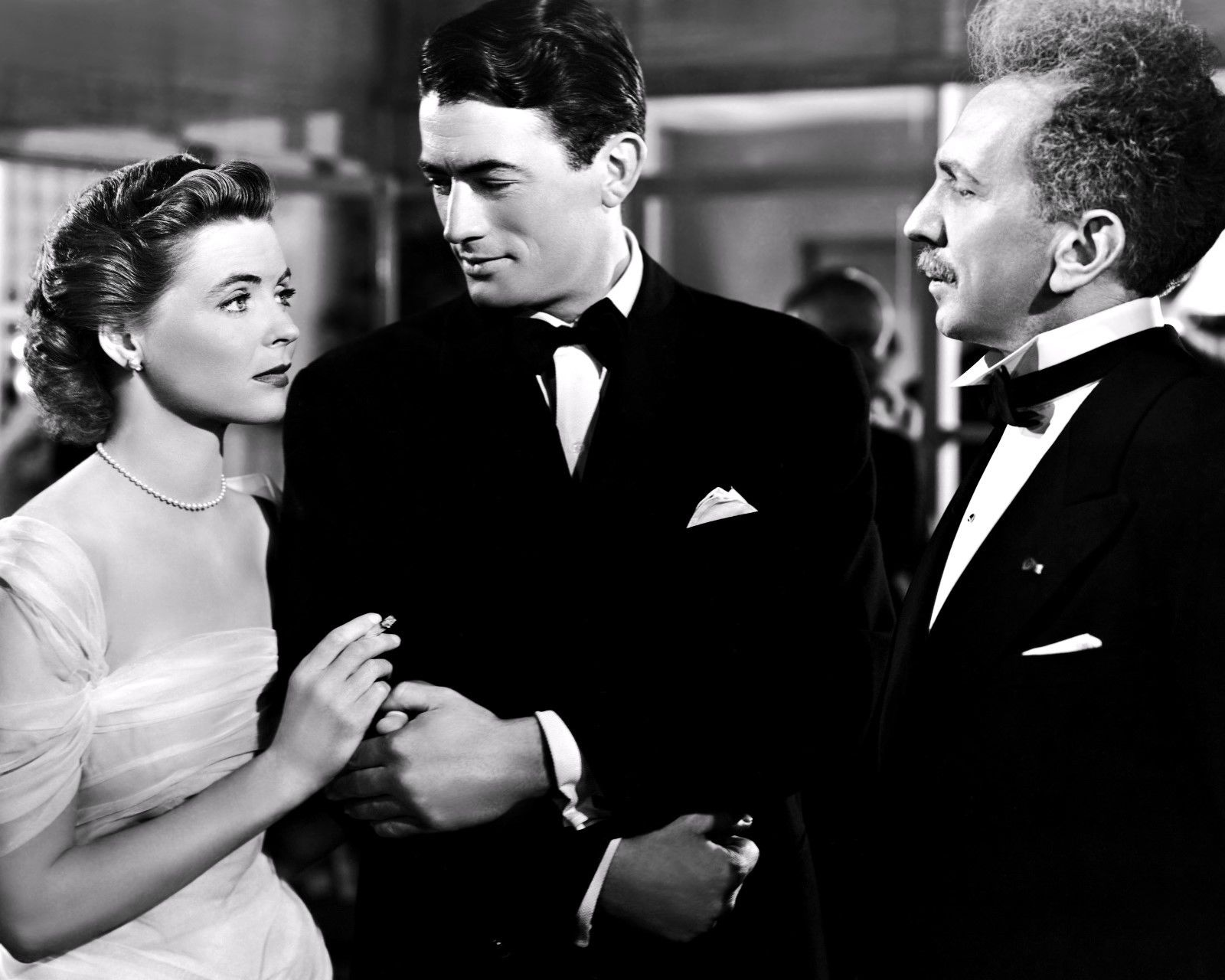
Peck with actors Dorothy McGuire and Sam Jaffe in Gentleman's Agreement (1947)

In November 1947, Peck's next film, the landmark Gentleman's Agreement, directed by Elia Kazan, was released and was immediately proclaimed as "Hollywood's first major attack on anti-Semitism." Based on a novel, the film has Peck portraying a New York magazine writer who pretends to be Jewish so he can experience personally the hostility of bigots. It was nominated for eight Academy Awards, including Peck for Best Actor, winning in the Best Film and Best Director categories. It was the second-highest top-grossing film of 1948. Peck would indicate in his later years that the film was one of his proudest works. Upon release, Gentleman's Agreement was widely praised for both its courageousness and its quality, (Note: Variety wrote, the movie "provides an almost overwhelming emotional experience," is "memorable for numerous vivid impelling passages," has "great dramatic depth and force," "is a credit to the screen" and that the screenplay, direction and cinematography are all excellent, but acknowledged it has "some disappointing or confusing scenes.") Peck's performance has been described as very convincing by many critics, both upon release and in recent years. (Note: Bosley Crowther wrote, "the role is crisply and agreeably played by Gregory Peck;" Variety said, Peck "is quiet, almost gentle, progressively intense and resolute, with just the right suggestion of inner vitality and turbulence." TV Guide says Peck gives "a convincing portrayal" and refers to "the excellence of Peck;" Richard Gilliam of AllMovie says, "the performances...are quite good, especially (that) of Peck;" Tom Hutchinson of Radio Times says "it's one of Peck's finest performances.") In recent decades, critics have expressed differing opinions regarding Peck's portrayal, the quality of the film by modern standard, and the film's effectiveness at addressing anti-semitism, (Note: Christopher Tookey says "Once considered courageous and powerful, now it looks terribly slow, preachy and melodramatic. More evidence...the socially important film of today is the deservedly forgotten film of tomorrow;" Michael Gebert writes, "In retrospect, rarely has so much praise been lavished on such an inconsequential film.... Coming on the heels of the Holocaust, it seems almost obscene to lavish so much attention on such a minor, upper-class aspect of anti-Semitism" Time Out says "sentimental and muddled...it wears its heart on its sleeve rather than offers any analysis of the problem...looks remarkedly dated in places. Good performances, however, particularly from Garfield and Holm.") with film writer Matt Bailey writing "Gentleman's Agreement may have been an important film at one time, but was never a good film." (Note: George Aachen commented "Peck's amateurishly mannered performance with its wearisome trick of delivery and inflection, makes (the movie) seem even more unrealistic," and John Howard Reid wrote, "The glum humorless Peck is in every scene bar one-though he does not hold the monopoly on strained acting.") (Note: Barry Monush observes it is "a film looked upon as very mild dramatic fare by modern audiences, but one that much good in its day." TV Guide writes, "today it looks like heart on a sleeve, but the film is a landmark film" and "remains a classic crusading film." David Sterritt, of TCM, says the film "ranks with the best of the "problem pictures" made by Hollywood in the wake of WWII...it comes across as smart, incisive and engrossing drama, and although times have changed since 1947, the subject it so boldly tackles remains timely and relevant to this day." Tom Hutchinson of Radio Times asserts "An eye-opener in its day...(it) still has the power to compel ...is successful in showing that subtle malaise is barely recognized as such by the people who sustain it ...members of the cast produce work of...high quality." In 2017, Peter Bradshaw of The Guardian wrote, "Gentleman's Agreement is still a riveting movie, intriguing, a little exasperating, alternately naive and very sharp.")

Peck's next three releases were commercial disappointments. The Paradine Case was his second and last film with Hitchcock. When producer David O. Selznick insisted on casting Peck for the movie, Hitchcock was apprehensive, questioning whether Peck could properly portray an English lawyer. In later years, Peck did not speak fondly of the making of the movie. Released in 1947,The Paradine Case was a British-set courtroom drama about a defense lawyer in love with his client. It had an international cast including Charles Laughton, Ethel Barrymore and Alida Valli as the accused. The movie received positive reviews, with many complimenting Peck's performance, (Note: Bosley Crowther wrote, the movie is "one fitfully intriguing tale, smoothly told through a cultivated camera. It isn't a too-well-written story...it goes into Old Bailey Courtroom and stays there for most of the film. Courtroom action tends to get weary.... Hitchcock has made the most of a difficult script and has got as much tension in a courtroom as most directors could get in a frontier fort. Gregory Peck is impressively impassioned as the famous young London barrister who lets his heart, cruelly captured by his client, rule his head." Variety wrote, "Peck's statue as a performer of ability stands him in good stead among extremely tough competition.") but it was panned by the public, only recouping half of the $4.2 million production costs. In recent decades, the film was criticized by most prominent writers, although critic's praised Peck's acting. (Note: Patrick Legare of AllMovie commented, it is "talky, slow-moving...with a lack of any sustained action" and "Peck gives respectable performance;" Jay S. Steinberg of TCM, laments it has "a rather verbose narrative that never quite builds dramatically...but with instances that reveal the director's visual flair" and as featuring "earnest and engaging performances." TV Guide says "Hitchcock tried mightily but didn't quite overcome the rambling, overlong script.") Writers Paul Condon and Jim Sangster stated that "Peck is vulnerable yet believable in a role that requires significant delicacy of touch to maintain viewer's loyalty and interest."

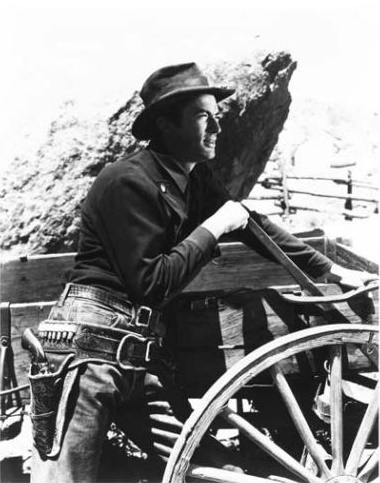
Peck in the film Yellow Sky (1948)

Peck shared top billing with Anne Baxter in the Western Yellow Sky (1948), named for the ghost town where Peck's group of bank robbers seek refuge and encounters the spunky tomboy Baxter, her grandfather, and their gold. Peck gradually develops an interest in Baxter's character, who in turn seems to rediscover her femininity and develops an interest in him. (Note: Craig Butler of AllMovie writes, "crackling good screenplay...with memorable dialogue and clearly drawn characters...beautifully detailed direction that doesn't skimp on suspense or action and that even makes the love angle work...aided by stark, almost expressionistic cinematography, a feast of black-and-white images that carry on their own considerable emotional weight" and "a marvelous cast." Time Out says, "A fine Western, harshly shot...(the) screenplay develops WR Burnett's source story with the Tempest in mind, the subtler analogies serving to provide resonances...the conflict similarly resolves strangely, at its violent climax, into a sense of conciliation. Beautifully cast and characterized." Leonard Maltin states, "Exciting western.... Similar in atmosphere to Wellman's classic The Ox-Bow Incident.") Critics who commented on Peck's performance felt it to be solid, (Note: TV Guide writes, "Peck is thoroughly believable in a part which contrasts greatly with many of his others.") but said the plot was slightly unbelievable. (Note: TV Guide refers to "the unlikely ending." Time Out says "the conflict similarly resolves strangely...into a sense of conciliation." Christopher Tookey says "The film is better at the beginning than later on...when Peck becomes too much of a goodie-goodie to be credible.") The film was only moderately commercially successful. A year later, Peck was paired with Ava Gardner for their first of three films together in The Great Sinner (1949), a period drama-romance where a Russian writer, Peck, becomes addicted to gambling while helping Gardner and her father pay back their debts. Peck ended up becoming great friends with Gardner, and would later declare her his favorite co-star. Their friendship lasted the rest of Gardner's life, and upon her death in 1990, Peck took in both her housekeeper and her dog. The film received unfavorable reviews usually describing it as dull, (Note: Bosley Crowther labeled it "as a dreary picture" with "the actors entrapped by a weak script and fustian direction.") and the public was not interested, rendering it a commercial disappointment. In modern times, the film has received mixed reviews (Note: Margarita Landazuri of TCM says "The Great Sinner" may not be faithful to Dostoevsky (the author of the sourcebook), but it is high-gloss MGM, with some excellent performances that make it well worth watching.") but TV Guide says "this often gripping film" has strong performances, that "Peck is powerful" in his portrayal. Peck initially rejected the film, his last movie under his MGM contract, eventually agreeing to do it as a favor to the studio's production head.

His second 1949 release, Twelve O'Clock High (1949), was the first of many films in which Peck embodies the brave, effective, yet human, "fighting man." Based on true events, Peck portrays the new commander of a "hard luck" U.S. World War II bomber group tasked with instilling discipline and pride into the pilots and crews. He believes the former commander failed because he identified too closely with the men and his overly protective attitude caused the squadron to fail in its mission. Peck succeeds in whipping the command into shape, but finds himself caring deeply for his men and finally breaks down after losing his adjutant on a particularly rough mission over Schweinfurt. The National Board of Review ranked it in their top ten films of the year and it received four Academy Awards nominations, Best Actor for Peck. Peck was later recognized in the New York Film Critics Circle for the role. Twelve O'Clock High was a commercial success, finishing tenth in the 1950 box office rankings. The film received strong reviews upon release. (Note: Bob Thomas of the Associated Press wrote, "It is one of the best treatments of WWII but not without its defects. These include its length and some old war picture cliches. But the acting (especially Peck) and direction approach greatness.") Recent critics maintain positive opinions. (Note: Aubry D. Arminio of AllMovie says, "The story of Peck's General Savage remains one of the most fair and celebrated accounts of leadership.... Twelve O'Clock High is a sincere and realistic war film." TV Guide says "Firm film, peak Peck...in addition to fine acting, Twelve O'Clock High features some gorgeous camerawork and one of the most horrifying aerial attack sequences ever put on film...the subsequent devaluation of King's work is a gross injustice." Leonard Maltin says "Taut story...Peck has never been better." Tom Hutchinson of Radio Times says "To watch Gregory Peck crack under the strain of high command...is as alarming as the collapse of the Statue of Liberty: he's such a monument to liberal integrity.... It's all a wonderful example of ensemble acting.") Evaluations of Peck's performance were positive, (Note: see also modern reviews; Variety wrote, "Peck gives the character much credence as he suffers and sweats with his men." David Thomson says Peck is "quite riveting." TV Guide says "Peck gives a flawless performance." Barry Monush says "Peck does his best work yet to date.") with The New York Times describing "High and particular praise for Gregory Peck.... Peck does an extraordinarily able job in revealing the hardness and the softness of a general exposed to peril." Film historian Peter von Bagh considers Peck's performance "as Brigadier General Frank Savage to be the most enduring of his life."

=== 1950–1953: Worldwide recognition ===
Peck began the 1950s with two Westerns, the first being The Gunfighter (1950), directed by Henry King, who had worked with him previously on Twelve O'Clock High. Peck plays an aging "Top Gun of the West" who is now weary of killing and wishes to retire with his alluring but pragmatic wife and his seven-year-old son, both of whom he has not seen for many years. Peck and King did much photographic research about the Wild West Era, discovering that most cowboys had facial hair, "bowl" haircuts and wore beat-up clothing; Peck subsequently wore a mustache while filming. The studio's president called for re-shoots upon seeing the initial footage with the mustache, but backed out due to costs that were inflated by the production manager at King and Peck's persuasion. The Gunfighter had disappointing sales at the box office, with $5.6 million in receipts, 47th place for earnings in 1951. 20th Century Fox's studio chief Darryl Zanuck blamed Peck's mustache for the lukewarm reaction from Peck's typical fans, stating that they wanted to see the usual handsome, clean-shaven Peck, not the authentic-cowboy Peck. The Gunfighter received "solid reviews" upon release, with particular enthusiasm from some critics, (Note: Variety's website review says "Gregory Peck perfectly portrays the title role, a man doomed to live out his span killing to keep from being killed. He gives it great sympathy and a type of rugged individualism that makes it real" and TCM's Jeremy Arnold says Variety's original review also called it "dynamic potent drama.... Packs a terrific dramatic wallop that has seldom been equaled in any type of picture." TCM also says another The New York Times reviewer wrote, it has "rare suspense and a tingling accumulation of good, pungent western atmosphere.") with Peck's performance "bringing him some of his best notices." The New York Times wrote, "through Mr. Peck's fine performance, a fair comprehension is conveyed of the loneliness and the isolation of a man with a lurid name...an arresting and quite exciting film." The movie has grown in critical appreciation over the years and "is now considered one of the all-time classic Westerns" (Note: Christopher Tookey says "It's gained in critical respectability over the years." Brian Whitener of AllMovie says, "often imitated by other Westerns, its morally difficult, and compelling tale make it one of the most important films produced in the 1950s.") Critics of recent decades uniformly praise Peck's performance, (Note: TV Guide says "Peck is dazzling." Leonard Malton says "Peck is most effective." Christopher Tookey says "Peck underacts effectively." Ronald Bergen says "Peck brings gravitas to the role of a man who cannot escape his past." Luccia Bozzola of AllMovie says, Peck's performance is "laconic yet deeply felt." Time Outsays his role was "flawlessly acted by Peck.") with David Parkinson of Radio Times saying "Peck gives a performance of characteristic dignity and grit." (Note: Lucia Bozzola of AllMovie says, it is "a notable predecessor to the revisionist emphasis on the end of the Westerner (and the West) in the 1960s and 1970s...[it is] lauded for...its adept psychological examination of the unwanted results of myth-making violence." Leonard Malton says "classic psychological Western. Catch this one!" Jeremy Arnold of TCM says it is "seen as a key forerunner to the dark psychological westerns of the later 1950s.")

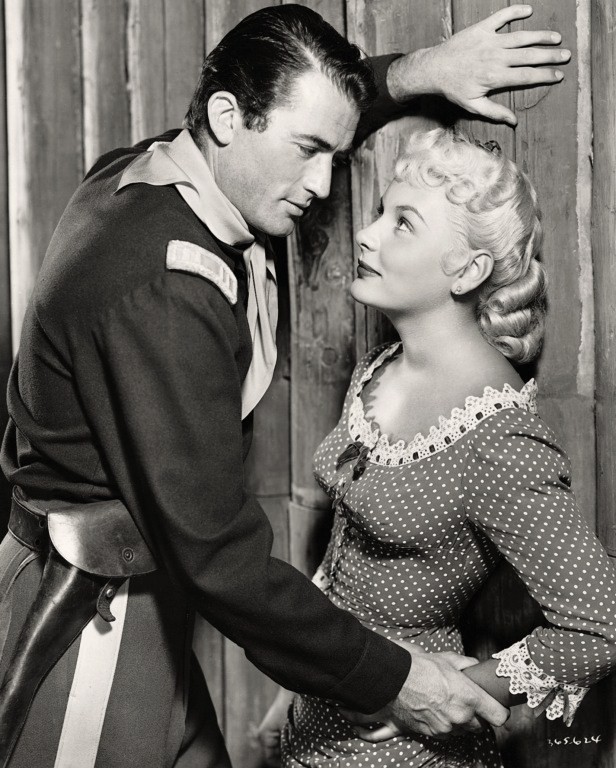
Peck and Barbara Payton in Only the Valiant (1951)

Peck's next Western was Only the Valiant (1951), a low-budget movie; Peck disliked the script and would later label the film as the low point of his career. Peck's non-exclusive contract with David O. Selznick permitted Selznick to sell Peck's services to Warner Bros for this movie after running into financial difficulties. The plot of the film is listed as "an unpopular, strict leader gathers together a rag-tag group of men and leads them on an extremely dangerous mission, turning them into a well-oiled fighting machine by the end and earning respect along the way." Peck portrays a U.S. army captain and the mission is to protect an undermanned army fort against the attacking Apaches. Peck's romantic interest was played by Barbara Payton. Variety's review said "In this cavalry yarn...great pains have been exerted to provide interesting characters. Peck makes the most of a colorful role." It earned a moderate $5.7 million, ranking 35th in sales for the year. This little-remembered picture receives mixed reviews today, although Peck's acting is praised. (Note: Time Out says "a sinewy, unsympathetic Peck impresses." TV Guide writes "Though a disappointing Western with a routine plot, it is somewhat redeemed by its star and a solid supporting cast. The script never rises about the intelligence of a B western and the production design is obviously artificial, but the cast makes all the difference.... Peck turned in a decent performance and pulled the film out of the doldrums." Craig Butler of AllMovie asserts, it "is a fairly routine Western, but it does boast a fine cast that makes it quite watchable.... [The] script is much too familiar and written with far too little imagination.... [It has] a by-the-numbers plot. Gordon M. Douglas' direction doesn't overcome the deficiencies in the screenplay; his work is efficient and competent, but rather more is needed here.... Peck is in great 'cards to the vest' form here, and he holds the film together with his sheer star power.")

Peck's second 1951 release was the book-to-film adaptation Captain Horatio Hornblower, featuring Peck as the commander of a warship in the British fleet during the Napoleonic Wars who finds romance with Virginia Mayo's character. Peck was attracted to the character, saying, "I thought Hornblower was an interesting character. I never believe in heroes who are unmitigated and unadulterated heroes, who never know the meaning of fear." The role had been originally intended for Errol Flynn, but he was felt to be too old by the time the project came to fruition. Directed by Raoul Walsh,Captain Horatio Hornblower was a box office success, finishing ninth for the year in the UK and seventh in the North America. Peck's role in the film was largely praised by reviewers. The Associated Press stated that Peck provided "the proper dash and authenticity as the remarkable nineteenth-century skipper" and Variety later wrote "Peck stands out as a skilled artist, capturing the spirit of the character and atmosphere of the period." Modern reviews have given mixed reactions to Peck's performance. (Note: Mark Bourne of the DVD Journal asserts "Gregory Peck would be nobody's first choice for the role...but he looks so comfortable barking orders...providing leadership...or lovingly ministering Virginia Mayo back to health...that we ease into the characterization with him." TV Guide says "Peck's a touch sober for a credible swashbuckler...[but is] full of valiant guff" in the role.) Richard Gilliam of AllMovie argues that it is "an excellent performance from Gregory Peck" stating that "Peck brings his customary aura of intelligence and moral authority to the role," while the Radio Times asserts "Gregory Peck plays Hornblower as a high-principle stuff shirt and thus confounds director Raoul Walsh's efforts to inject some pace." (Note: Mark Bourne of DVD Journal says the film has "excellent cinematography and ship-battles effects.... The film looks terrific and moves with strong winds in the sails. Peck gets the necessary support from a fine ensemble crew of character actors...that the script kindly remembers to need entertaining things to do and say. The often lush cinematography...includes striking work [that] captures Peck and Mayo in golden-toned shots that are warm and romantic without being 'romancy' or trite." Leonard Maltin assesses it as an "Exciting, well-produced sea epic." Richard Gilliam of AllMovie argues it "features several nicely staged battle sequences.... If the film has a flaw. it's that it spends too much time on Hornblower's uninteresting relationship with Barbara Wellesley (Virginia Mayo); the scenes seem tacked-on, detracting from the naval drama." Time Out says it "is as much a study of the heroic spirit as an action romp. Director Raoul Walsh seems more interested in their inner life and emotional vulnerability, which makes for an oddly limpid (but often quite beautiful) and non-dynamic work." David Parkinson of the Radio Times observes "this sprawling, handsome but flat feature suffers from too many shifts in emphasis between action-adventure and psychological study. What should have been stirring spends too much time becalmed.")

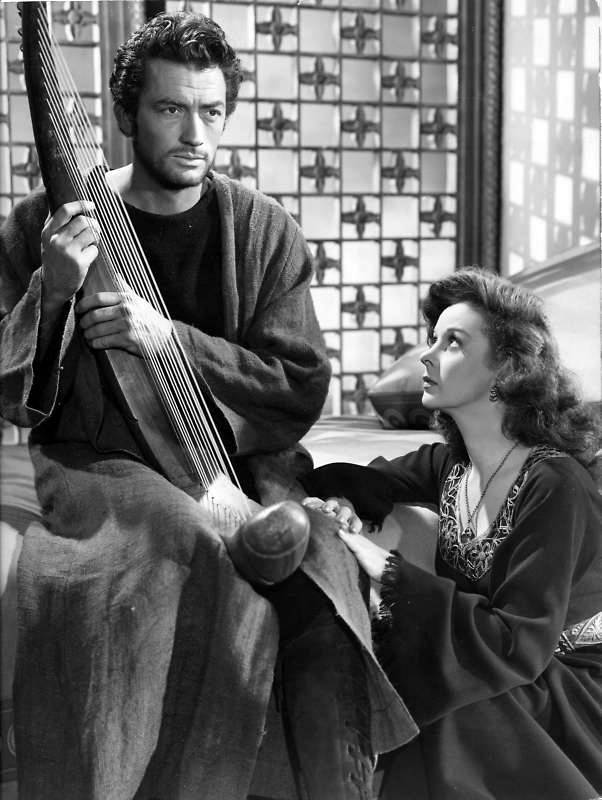
Peck alongside co-star Susan Hayward in David and Bathsheba

His third film under Henry King's direction, David and Bathsheba, a Biblical epic, was the top-grossing movie of 1951. The two-hit-movie punch of Horatio and David elevated Peck to the status of Hollywood mega-star. David and Bathsheba tells the story of David (Peck), who slew Goliath as a teenager, and later as the beloved King, becomes infatuated with the married Bathsheba, played by Susan Hayward. Peck's performance in David and Bathsheba was evaluated upon release by The New York Times as "an authoritative performance," and Variety stated "Peck is a commanding personality...he shades his character expertly," In recent years, critics have argued that his "stiff" performance is made up for in charisma, but overall, they praised his strength in the role; Leonard Maltin says the movie has "only fair performances." David and Bathsheba opened with positive reviews, including praise for avoiding excessive spectacle (Note: Bosley Crowther asserted the film "avoids pageantry and overwhelming concocted spectacle...the rest of the cast is entirely overshadowed by (Peck's) role.... Having been mounted artistically, an age-old tale now takes on colorful dimensions...for all its verbosity and occasional slickness and sensuality (it) makes its points with feeling and respect." Variety said "This is a big picture in every respect.... Expert casting throughout focuses on each characterization" with each performer doing strong work except for Hayward.) while remaining an epic with "dignified restraint."

Peck returned to swashbucklers in The World in His Arms (1952), reuniting him with director Raoul Walsh. Peck portrays a seal-hunting ship captain in 1850 San Francisco who romances a Russian countess played by Ann Blyth and ends up engaging a rival sealer played by Anthony Quinn in a sailing race to Alaska. The film was given positive reviews by both contemporary and modern critics. (Note: Bosley Crowther wrote, "A couple of handsome down-east schooners, racing furiously through a wind-swept sea...pretty much steal a robust show from Gregory Peck, Ann Blyth and other mortals. And this is no whit of discredit to the mere actors in this lively film; they are faced with uneven competition in this drama.... [It's loaded] with muscular and romantic action of the juiciest and easily playable sort...the action spills forth without clear reason...the characters presented make more motion and color than they make sense. Gregory Peck as the venturesome hero is only a shade more restrained than Anthony Quinn who plays a Portuguese captain as though he were animated by hot feet and rum.") All Movie commented that Peck is "a superb actor, who brings enormous skill to the part, but who simply lacks the overt derring-do and danger that is part of the role." The film was moderately successful, more so in the UK than in North America.

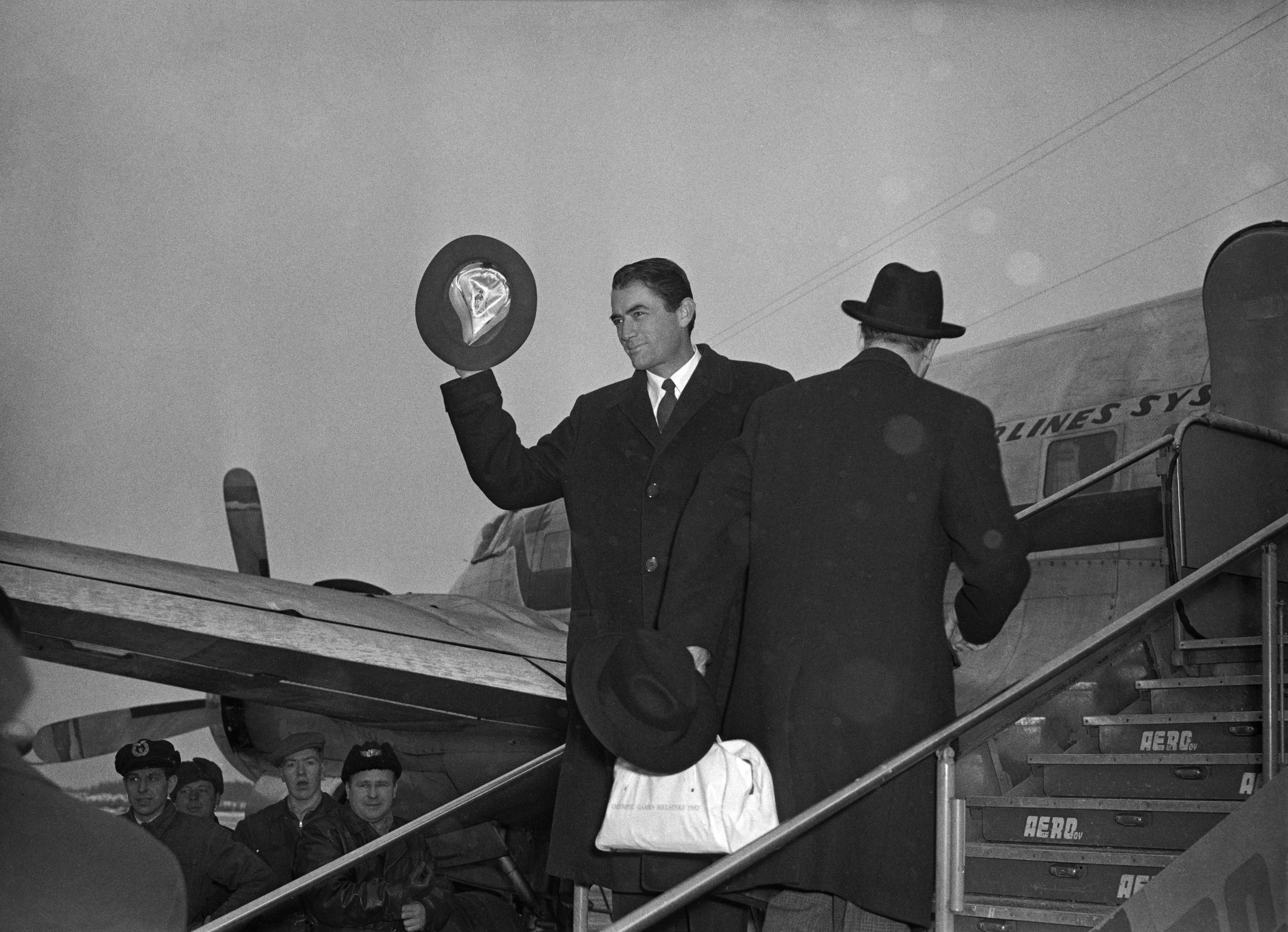
Peck greets his admirers at the Helsinki Airport in January 1953

He reunited with previous collaborators King, Hayward, and Gardner in The Snows of Kilimanjaro (1952), an adaptation of a short story by Ernest Hemingway. The film stars Peck as a self-concerned writer looking back on his life, particularly his romance with his first wife (Gardner), while he slowly dies from an accidental wound while on an African hunting expedition with his current wife (Hayward) nursing him. The film was praised for its cinematography and direction. (Note: Bosley Crowther wrote, "Thanks to a skillful combination of some sensational African hunting scenes, a musical score of rich suggestion and a vivid performance by Gregory Peck (it is) a handsome and generally absorbing film (and) a taut, eye-filling film. The flow of romances...is exquisitely colorful, alluring and loaded with heavy sentiment. But a stubbornly analytic viewer will still be moved to inquire what all this chasing about with women demonstrates or proves?...[The filmmakers] have not made a clearly convincing film. However, they have made a picture that constantly fascinates the eyes and stimulates the emotions...the overall production in wonderful color is full of brilliant detail and surprise and the mood of nostalgia and wistful sadness that is built up in the story has its spell.... Peck, by the force and vigor of his physical attitudes, suggests a man of burning temper and melancholy moods." Variety commented "Ava Gardner makes the part of Cynthia a warm, appealing, alluring standout. Peck delivers with gusto the character of the writer.... Susan Hayward is splendid. The location-lensed footage...add(s) an important dress to the varied sequences. The African lensed backgrounds are brilliant, as are those on the Riviera and in Spain.") (Note: Craig Butler of AllMovie opines, "Gardner and Peck create the appropriate romantic chemistry...the direction is uneven...there's still enough here to engage most fans of romance movies." TV Guide wrote, "this story works splendidly under King's sure directorial hand and is enacted with power and conviction by Peck.... This beautifully photographed film...features a magnificent score by Herman that captures all the exotic locales profiled. Gardner is excellent...the script is a seamless blend of the screenwriter's and Hemingway's styles." Time Out says "the film tends to ramble and seems particularly uneven in its mixture of back-project wildlife footage, studio and location work." Leonard Maltin says "Peck finds his forte." Dave Kehr of the Chicago Reader says "overstuffed. There is some exquisite Technicolor photography, but director Henry King never moves the action beyond respectful superficiality.") Most reviews praise Peck's performance, with TV Guide saying the story is "enacted with power and conviction by Peck," although some criticized his "bland" expressions. Peck, who at that time was married to Finnish American-born Greta Kukkonen, even made a two-day visit to Helsinki in January 1953, participating in an invited guest premiere of The Snows of Kilimanjaro that premiered in Finland. The Snows of Kilimanjaro was a box office hit and ranked as the fourth-highest-grossing movie of 1952.

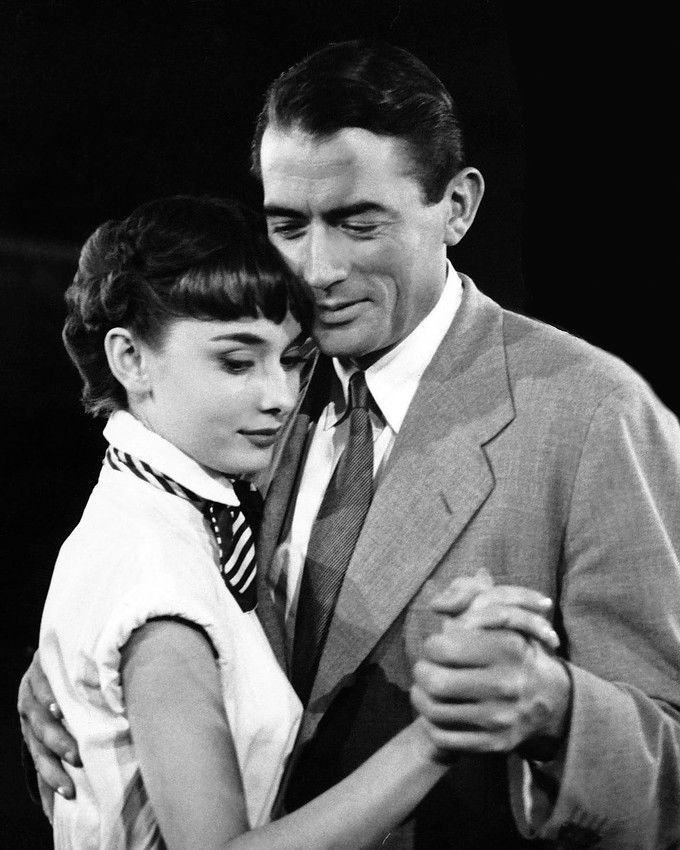
Peck and Audrey Hepburn in a promotional still for Roman Holiday (1953)

Peck's "first real foray into comedy" was Roman Holiday (1953), directed by William Wyler. He portrayed American journalist Joe Bradley opposite Audrey Hepburn in her first significant film role, playing a European princess. Peck's role in Roman Holiday had originally been offered to Cary Grant, who turned it down because the part appeared to be more of a supporting role to the princess. Peck had the same concern, but he was persuaded by Wyler that the on-site filming in Rome would be an exceptional experience and Peck accepted the part, eventually insisting that Hepburn's name be above the title of the film (just beneath his) in the opening credits. Peck later stated that he'd told his agent, "I'm smart enough to know this girl's going to win the Oscar in her first picture, and I'm going to look like a damned fool if her name is not up there on top with mine."

Roman Holiday was a commercial success, finishing 22nd in the box office in 1953. The film continued to make money after its release, with "modern sources noting it earned $10 million total at the box office." Critics praised Peck's performance; Bosley Crowther stated that "Peck makes a stalwart and manly escort...whose eyes belie his restrained exterior," while the Hollywood Reporter commented that "Peck turns in another of his outstanding performances playing the love-smitten reporter with intelligence and good-humored conviction;" The film was met with critical acclaim. (Note: Milton Luban of the Hollywood Reporter said, "With Gregory Peck and Audrey Hepburn turning in superb performances, Roman Holiday is 118 minutes of sheer entertainment" elaborating that it has a "delightful screenplay that sparkles with wit and outrageous humor that at times comes close to slapstick" and that the "cinematographers do a fine job of incorporating Roman landmarks into the storyline.") (Note: Leonard Maltin labels it "Utterly charming." TV Guide praises it as "Charming, wistful and frothy" and says it "has enough adventure and excitement to satisfy, and the faintly bittersweet note of the ending is made deliciously palatable by its artistic rightness." Joshua Klein says "Peck and Hepburn are excellent...Rome's landmarks help enhance the already magical story. Just as essential is the enjoyable script." Time Out succinctly states "near-perfect rom-com.") It was nominated for multiple accolades, including 10 Academy Awards, with Hepburn winning for Best Actress; Peck also scored a BAFTA nomination for Foreign Actor. At the 1955 Golden Globe awards, Peck and Hepburn were named the World Film Favorite Award winners for their respective genders.

=== 1954–1957: Overseas and New York ===
With his acclaimed performance in The Gunfighter, Peck was offered the lead role in High Noon (1952) but turned it down because he did not want to become typecast in Westerns. Peck was based in the United Kingdom for about eighteen months between 1953 and 1955; new tax laws had drastically raised the tax rate on high-income earners, but the amount due would be reduced if the payer worked outside the country for extended periods. After Roman Holiday's production in Italy, his three subsequent films were shot and set in London, Germany and Southeast Asia, respectively. Peck starred in The Million Pound Note (1954), based on a Mark Twain short story. Peck enjoyed the film's production as "it was a good comedy opportunity" and "was given probably the most elegant wardrobe he had ever worn in film." He plays a penniless American seaman in 1903 London who is given a one million pound bank note by two rich, eccentric brothers who wish to ascertain if he can survive for one month without spending any of it. The film performed modestly at the box office and received mixed reviews for its production. (Note: TV Guide enthuses "This delightful comedy is convincingly acted by Peck...the direction is full of vitality and the movie provides consistent humor and delightful situations...is beautifully photographed and the Victorian-era sets are impressive...a rewarding satire on human greed and British traditions.") Adrian Turner of the Radio Times praised it as a "lovely comedy" which "has a lot of charm and gentle humor, owing to Peck's evident delight in the role and the unobtrusive direction" adding it has a "witty script."

Peck portrayed a US army colonel investigating the kidnapping of a young soldier in Night People (1954). He later stated that the role was one of his favorites as his lines were "tough and crisp and full of wisecracks, and more aggressive than other roles" he'd played. The film received praise for its production and direction, but did poorly at the box office. Peck flew to Sri Lanka to film The Purple Plain (1954), playing a Canadian bomber pilot with strong emotional problems during the Second World War. The Purple Plain was panned in the United States but became a hit in the United Kingdom, ranking tenth at the box office in 1954, and was nominated for a BAFTA Award for Outstanding British Film. Of his performance, Crowther wrote, "the extent of Peck's agony is impressively transmitted...in vivid and unrelenting scenes." In recent years, the movie "has become one of Peck's most respected works," with critic David Thomson rating Peck's performance as excellent. Craig Butler of All Movie says that "Peck is astonishing, giving the sort of layered, intense yet nuanced performance that deserves major awards."

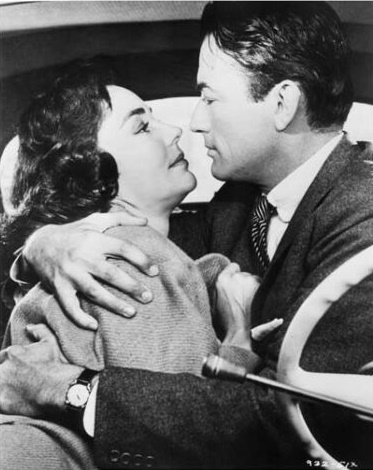
Peck with Jennifer Jones in a film still for The Man in the Gray Flannel Suit (1956)

In 1954, Peck was named the third most popular non-British film star in the United Kingdom. Peck did not have a film released in 1955. He made a comeback in the US. with The Man in the Gray Flannel Suit (1956), where he portrays a married, ex-soldier father of three who is increasingly haunted by his deeds in Italy during the Second World War. The film saw Peck reunited with Duel in the Sun co-star Jennifer Jones. During the filming of a scene where their characters argue, Jones clawed his face with her fingernails, prompting Peck to say to the director "I don't call that acting. I call it personal." The movie was successful, finishing eighth in box office gross for the year, despite contemporary and modern reviews being mixed. (Note: Bosley Crowther also wrote, the main character "possesses the humble, stoic valor one associates with Gregory Peck, who – by most fortunate coincidence – is present to play the role;" the director has arranged events "in a seemingly scattered yet clear and forceful way...he has, in short, a full, well-rounded film. To do this he had to take his sweet time...." The director "has wisely paced his film at a tempo that gives them plausible time to deliberate...the expensive production gives proper setting to this intelligent film...[t]he critical scene in which the hero tells his wife of his Italian child is also a long mordant passage that strikes sparks every second of the way." Harrison's Reports called it "one of the most absorbing pictures of the year," with "exceptionally fine" acting. Variety indicated "Peck is handsome and appealing, if not always convincing. It is only really in the romantic sequences with Marisa Pavan, who plays his Italian love, that he takes on warmth and becomes believable.... Playing opposite Peck as his wife is Jennifer Jones, and her concept of the role is faulty to a serious degree. Jones allows almost no feeling of any real relationship between her and Peck.... Fredric March is excellent, and the scenes between him and Peck lift the picture high above the ordinary.") (Note: TV Guide calls it "surprisingly engrossing, if shallow and overlong" and "Totally hollow trash with a hysteria-prone Jennifer Jones.... So slickly dished up, though, you can feel yourself sliding around on the sofa." Jonathan Rosenbaum of the Chicago Reader describes it as "lush" adding "The film may seem mediocre now (it did back then) but it probably speaks volumes about the period.") Butler of AllMovie declared that "the role fits (Gregory Peck) as if it had been tailor-made for him. Peck's particular brilliance lies in the quiet strength that is so much a part of him and the way in which he uses subtle changes in that quietness to signal mammoth emotions. He's given ample opportunity to do so here and the results are enthralling...an exceptional performance." Radio Times refers to "the excellent Peck" and states that Peck plays "the appealing flawed hero."

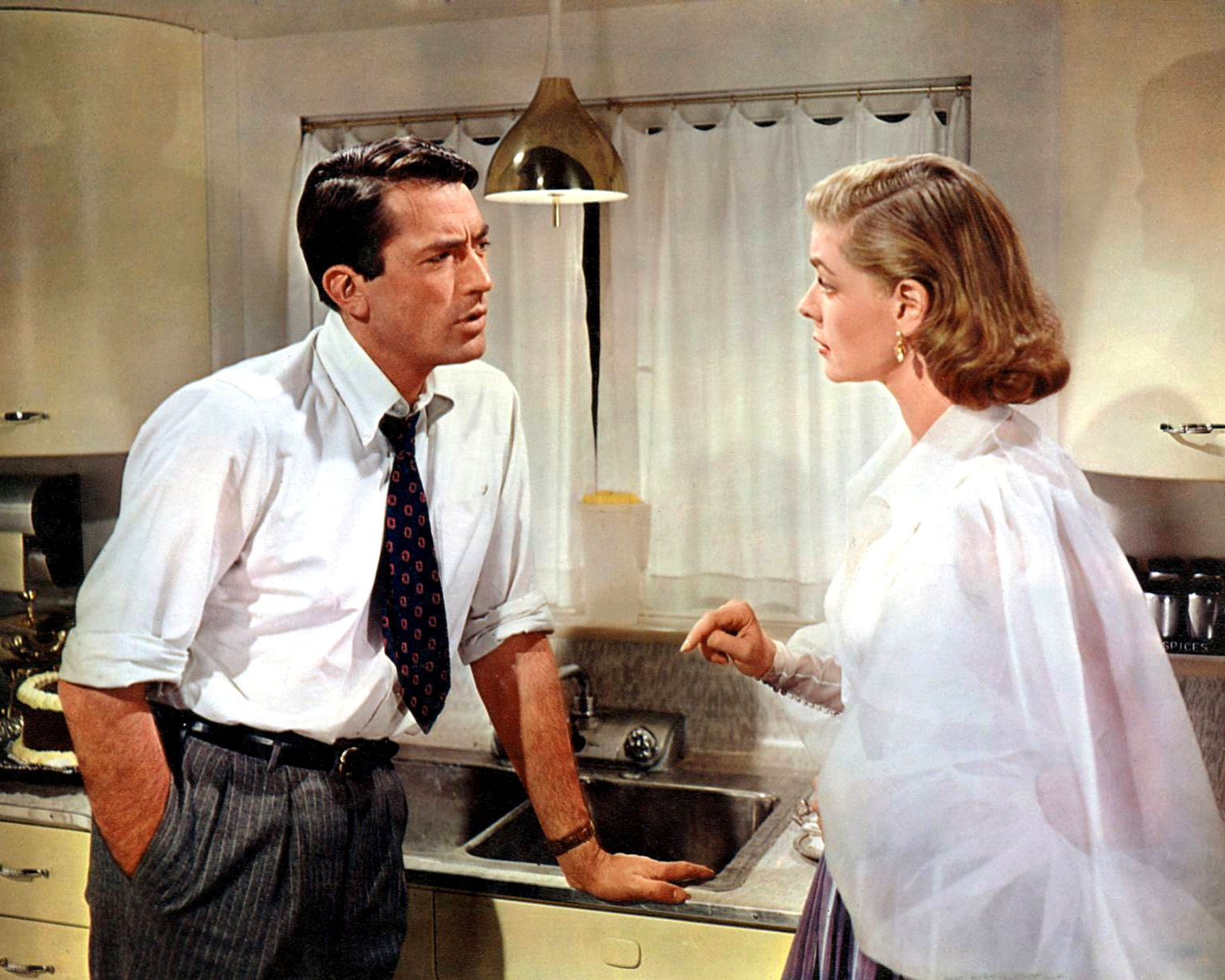
Peck and Lauren Bacall in the film Designing Woman (1957)

Peck next starred as Captain Ahab in the 1956 film adaptation of Herman Melville's Moby Dick; he was unsure about his suitability for the part but was persuaded by director John Huston to take the role. Peck almost drowned twice during filming in stormy weather off the sea coasts of Ireland, and several other performers and crew members suffered injuries. John Huston was named best director of the year by the New York Film Critics Circle and the National Board of Review for Moby Dick, but did not receive a nomination for the Academy Award for Best Director. The movie had the ninth highest box office of the year in North America, but cost $4.5 million to make, more than double the original budget, and was considered a commercial disappointment. In 2003, editor Barry Monush wrote, "There was, and continues to be, controversy over his casting as Ahab in Moby Dick." Upon opening, Variety said: "Peck often seems understated and much too gentlemanly for a man supposedly consumed by insane fury."The Hollywood Reporter argued "Peck plays it...in a brooding, smoldering vein, but none the less intensely and dynamically." In modern times, critics have said Peck is: "often mesmerizing"; "stoic" and "more than adequate"; and "lending a deranged dignity" to the role. Peck himself later said "I wasn't mad enough, not crazy enough, not obsessive enough – I should have done more. At the time, I didn't have more in me."

For romantic comedy Designing Woman (1957), Peck was permitted to choose his leading lady, Lauren Bacall, who needed to be busy with work as her husband Humphrey Bogart was gravely ill at the time. The film revolves around a fashion designer and a sports writer on a California vacation. They have a whirlwind romance and marry in haste, despite Peck's character already having a girlfriend back home, only to find upon their return to New York, that they have vastly different lifestyles. The film was mildly successful and entered at 35th for annual gross, but did not break even. Upon release, Variety said "Bacall...is excellent.... Peck is fine as the confused sportswriter" and saying that all the other actors/actresses give top-notch performances. (Note: Crowther noted "some of the verbal exchanges between Peck and Bacall have a nice little splash of wit about them. Good dialogue has been written by George Wells. The direction .. keeps things moving tolerably along until the end, when it bursts into a splurge of ostentation that is silly and in somewhat doubtful taste.") In recent years, the few reviews from prominent critics or websites are generally positive (Note: Leonard Malton writes "chic comedy reminiscent of the great Hepburn-Tracy vehicles. Bacall and Peck do their best,") with TV Guide exclaiming "they've made...the famous stoneface...Peck, somewhat funny. Bacall gives an especially good performance." Designing Woman won the Academy Award for Best Original Screenplay.

=== 1958–1959: Reflections on violence ===
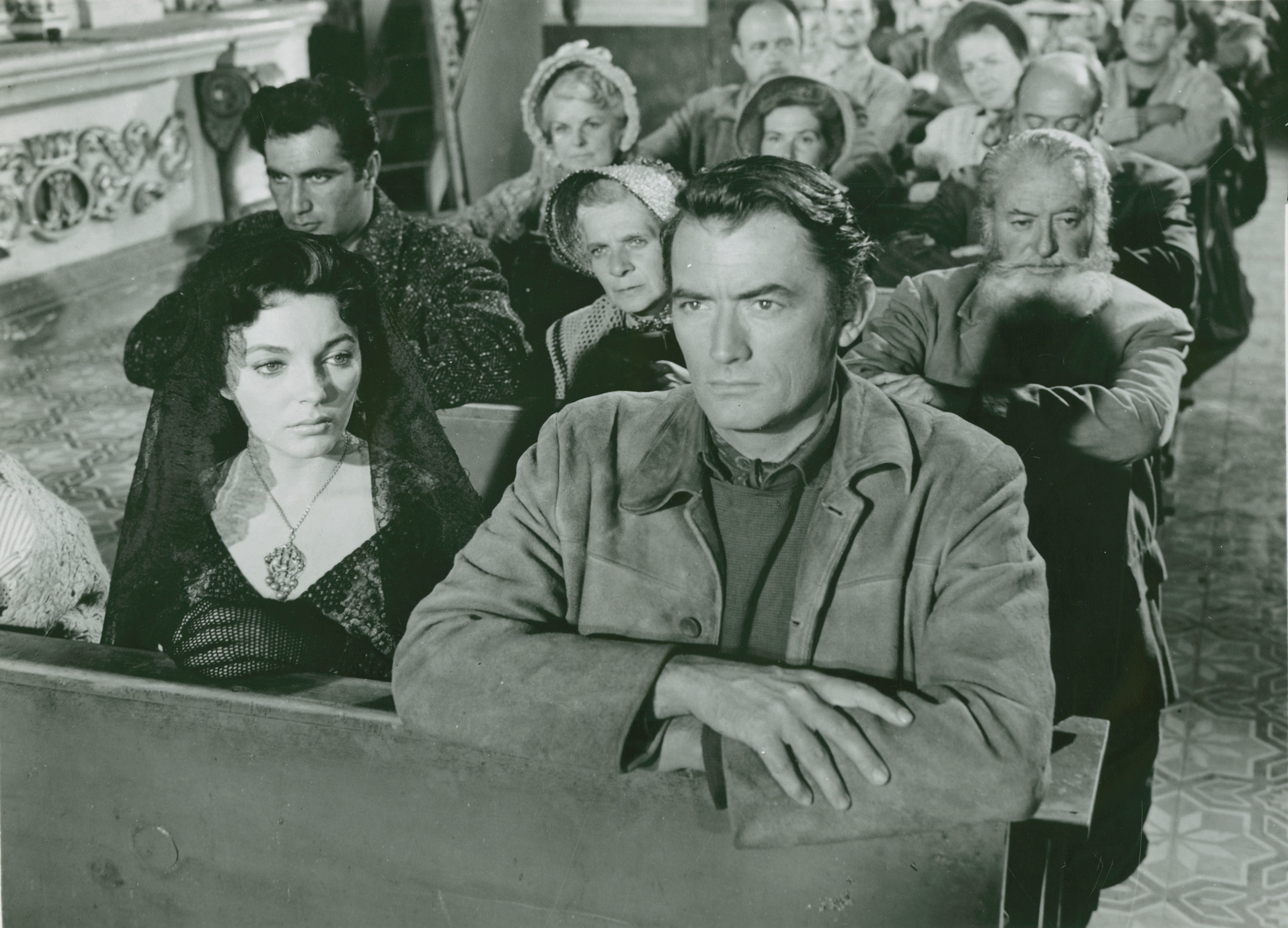
Peck and Joan Collins in The Bravados (1958)

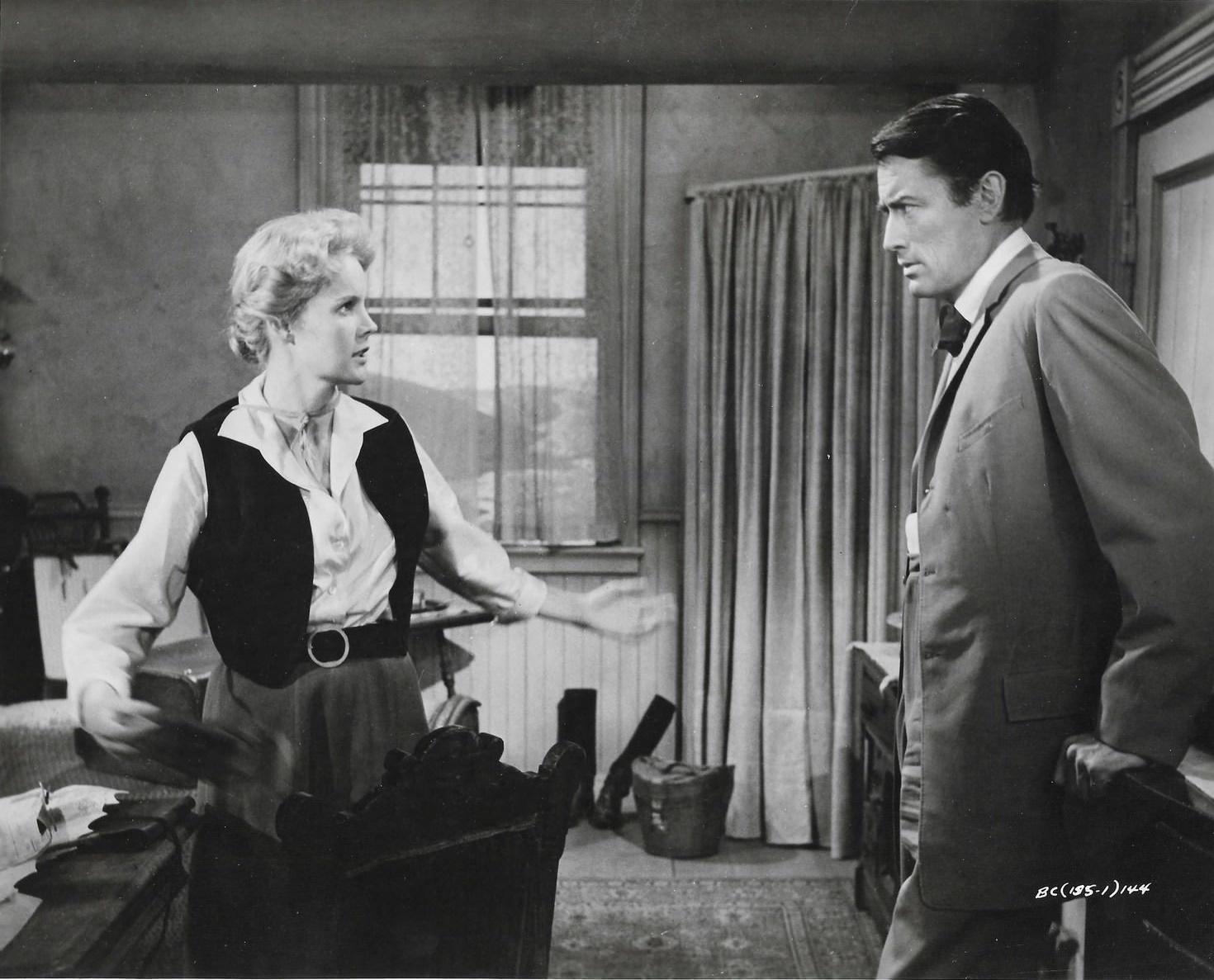
Peck and Carroll Baker in The Big Country (1958)

Peck's next movie, the Western The Bravados (1958), reunited him with director Henry King after a six-year gap. King was widely considered to have produced some of Peck's best work; Peck once said "King was like an older brother, even a father figure. We communicated without talking anything to death. It was direction by osmosis." In The Bravados, Peck's character spends weeks pursuing four outlaws whom he believes raped and murdered his wife and agonizing over his own morals. The film was a moderate success, finishing in the top 20 of the box office for 1959. In recent years, the film and Peck's performance have received mixed reviews, (Note: Leonard Maltin says it is "compelling;" Hal Erickson of AllMovie labeling it, "as grim and compelling as The Gunfighter;" film writer Peter Von Bagh asserts Peck's performance conveys an "ethical and charismatic radiance," Adrian Turner of the Radio Times opines the movie "isn't imbued with the emotional conviction it needs from either Peck or the usually capable director Henry King," "TV Guide also says "Outstanding in the film are color shots of gorges and precipitous mountains."A.H. Weiler of The New York Times had also said "Peck lends conviction to a role that could be a stereotype,") with Time Out asserting that "Peck's "crisis of conscience...is worked out in perfunctory religious terms;" and TV Guide stating that Peck's cowboy's "moment of truth is a powerful one and he gives it all the value it deserves, although much of his acting up to then had been lackluster."

In 1956, Peck made a foray into the film production business, organizing Melville Productions and later, Brentwood Productions. These companies produced five movies over seven years, all starring Peck, including Pork Chop Hill, for which Peck served as the executive producer. The films were observed by some as being more political, although Peck said he tried to avoid any "overt preachiness." In 1958, Peck and good friend William Wyler co-produced the Western epic The Big Country (1958) separate from Peck's production company. The project ran into numerous issues. Wyler and Peck were dissatisfied with the script, which underwent almost daily revisions after each day's shooting, causing stress for the performers; the actors would arrive the next day and find their lines and even entire scenes different from what they had prepared. The stellar cast included Jean Simmons, Carrol Baker, Chuck Connors, Charlton Heston and Burl Ives; Ives won the Academy Award for Best Supporting Actor for his intense performance. There were disagreements between director Wyler and the performers, resulting in Peck storming off-set when Wyler refused to re-shoot a close-up scene; Peck and Wyler's relationship remained strained for three years after production. Peck said in 1974 that he had tried producing and acting simultaneously and felt "either it can't be done or it's just that I don't do it well."

The film itself was a big hit, finishing fourth at the domestic box office in 1958 and second in the UK. At the time of release, reviews for The Big Country were mixed regarding the producers' prioritization of characterization versus technical filmmaking; opinions on Peck's performance were also disparate. (Note: Bosley Crowther wrote, "The Big Country does not get far beneath the skin of its conventional Western situation and its stock Western characters. It skims across standard complications and ends on a platitude even if the verbal construction and pictorial development of (complications/incidents) are measured, meticulous, robust and ringing with organ tones." Monthly Film Bulletin argued the efforts to convey a peace message were "superficial and pedestrian" adding that "the pivotal character of McKay, played on a monotonously self-righteous note by Peck, never comes alive. It's mainly due to the power of the climatic canyon battle, and Burl Ives' interesting playing as Rufus, that this remains a not unsympathetic film." Variety said it is "armed with a serviceable, adult western yarn.... The camera has captured a vast section of the southwest with such fidelity that the long stretches of dry country, in juxtaposition to tiny western settlements, and the giant canyon country in the arid area, have been recorded with almost three-dimensional effect" and "As a peace-loving easterner, Peck gives one of his better performances," with the other actors also giving strong performances. Harrison Reports declared it was "a first-rate super western, beautifully photographed" and added, "It is a long picture, perhaps too long for what the story has to offer, but there is never a dull moment from start to finish and it holds one's interest tightly throughout.") In recent decades, critical opinion of The Big Country has generally risen, although there is still disagreement; many prominent critics and publications describe the cinematography as excellent, some laud Peck's performance, and some cite the film as too long. (Note: Michael Betzold of AllMovie writes, "Staggering vistas and grandiose story make this an emblematic Western, though its emotions are transparent." Leonard Maltin says it is "overblown...the score has become a classic." Ronald Bergen describes it as "rousing epic" with "both sweep and substance" listing the "exciting opening sequence involving a carriage chase" and several action scenes as being highlights. Barry Monush enthuses Peck is "excellent as a man of integrity in a fine western." TV Guide argues it is "A huge, sprawling western with just about everything: brilliant photography, superb music, an intelligent script and excellent performances. If you hate westerns, you'll still enjoy this picture because the story could have taken place...anywhere...strong personalities clash. It's too long, true. Sharper editing was needed.")

Peck's next feature was Pork Chop Hill (1959), based on true events depicted in a book. Peck portrays a lieutenant during the Korean War who is ordered to use his infantry company to take the strategically insignificant Pork Chop Hill, as its capture would strengthen the U.S.'s position in the almost-complete armistice negotiations. As executive producer, Peck recruited Lewis Milestone of All Quiet on the Western Front (1930) to direct. Many critics label it as an anti-war film; it has also been stated that "as shooting progressed it became clear Peck and Milestone had very different artistic visions." Peck later said the movie showed "the futility of settling political arguments by killing young men. We tried not to preach; we let it speak for itself." Despite solid reviews, the film did only fair business at the box office. Most critics, both upon Pork Chop Hill's opening (Note: Bosley Crowther wrote, the battle scenes "as directed by Lewis Milestone, an old war-film hand, are realistic and effective" and "all represented expertly...but the awesome and lasting impressive feature is that enemy "voice" (from battle speakers) articulating all the resentments and misgivings of the American troops" and "the audacity to produce such a grim and rugged film, which tacitly points to the obsoleteness of ground warfare, merits applause." Variety wrote, "Pork Chop Hill is a grim, utterly realistic story that drives home both the irony of war and the courage men can summon to die in a cause they don't understand for and an objective which they know to be totally irrelevant. The accent on the combat is such that...the other men barely emerge as people. They look real, they sound real.") and in recent years, (Note: Leonard Maltin writes "gritty...with an impressive cast." Scott McGee of TCM says the film is "told with a hard-nosed style of harsh realism and fluid action" and "it was the sure-handed direction of veteran Lewis Milestone that determined the impact of Pork Chop Hill." Tony Sloman of Radio Times writes "This is the definitive Korean War movie.... Bleak and glum, it boasts a superb all-male cast headed by Gregory Peck at his glummest...the action sequences are terrific." Time Out writes "It details (quite brilliantly) the bloody assault on a hill of no particular value...impressive with fine performances." Barry Monush writes it "emphasizes gritty action over characterization.") agree that it is a gritty, grim and realistic rendering of battle action. Three critics who comment on Peck's performance are laudatory, (Note: TV Guide writes "Peck is outstanding as the resolute but compassionate commander." Bosley Crowther wrote, "Gregory Peck is convincingly stalwart") with Variety saying that Peck's performance is "completely believable. He comes through as a born leader, and yet it is quite clear that he has moments of doubt and of uncertainty."

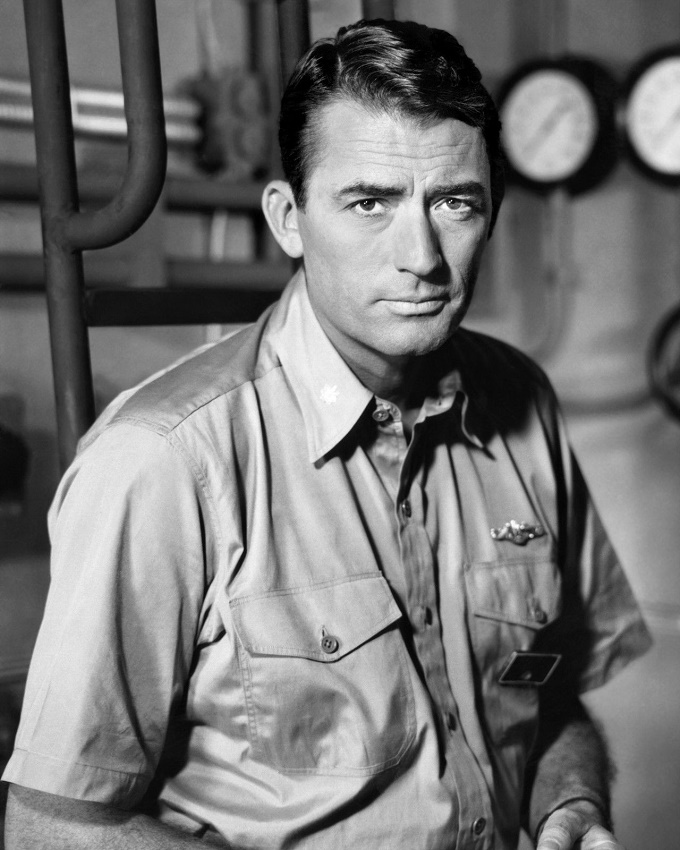
Peck in a publicity still for On the Beach (1959)

Peck's second release of 1959 cast him opposite Deborah Kerr in Beloved Infidel, which was based on the memoirs of film columnist Sheilah Graham. The film portrays the romance between Graham (Kerr) and author F. Scott Fitzgerald (Peck) during the last three years of his life, towards the end of which Fitzgerald was often drunk and abusive. Crowther assessed it as "generally flat and uninteresting" with a "postured performance of Gregory Peck...his grim-faced, monotony as a washout is relieved in a couple of critical scenes by some staggering and bawling as a drunkard, but that is hardly enough." Variety said that "the acting, while excellent and persuasive in parts, is shallow and artificial in others. Problem is primarily with Peck who brings to Fitzgerald the kind of clean-cut looks and youthful appearance that conflict with the image of a has-been novelist." Reviews from five prominent scribes in recent decades are similar, saying that Peck was blatantly miscast, (Note: Leonard Maltin writes "Ill-conceived casting of Peck makes (the film) more ludicrous than real; lush photography is the only virtue of blunt look at cinema capital." Barry Monush said that Peck was "blatantly miscast." Tony Sloman of Radio Times decrees it is "sunk by the staggering miscasting of Gregory Peck...the CinemaScope photography is stunning but to no avail." Craig Butler of AllMovie says, "Beloved Infidel is soapy, less than satisfying...it oversimplifies a relationship rather more complex than (what is shown).... Gregory Peck gives a performance that is so far off the mark as to be embarrassing. Peck was an extremely talented actor, but there is nothing in his personality that matches the qualities associated with Fitzgerald. As a result, Peck is totally at sea...incapable of pulling off either of the big drunk scenes the role requires. By contrast, Deborah Kerr is in peak form.... [T]here's also some yummy photography...this is not enough to make up for the film's fatal flaws...but it does make the film watchable." TV Guide says "Top production and stars give this one all they're worth but it could have been better.... Peck is miscast (he is dark-haired and towers well over six feet, whereas Fitzgerald was 5'7" and fair-haired), but he plays the role nobly.... It's a sad, almost wasted film which dwells not on Fitzgerald's courage and magnificent talent, but on his failure") TV Guide it was because of their physical differences, and Craig Butler saying "Peck was an extremely talented actor, but there is nothing in his personality that matches the qualities associated with Fitzgerald.

Peck starred next in On the Beach (1959) alongside Ava Gardner in their third and final film together. The film is considered to be Hollywood's first major movie about the implications of nuclear warfare. Directed by Stanley Kramer and based on Nevil Shute's best-selling book, it shows the last months of several people in Melbourne, Australia, as they await the onset of radioactive fallout from nuclear bombs. Peck portrays a U.S. submarine commander who has brought his crew to Australia from the North Pacific Ocean after nuclear bombs had been detonated in the northern hemisphere, who eventually romances Gardner's character. The film was named in the top ten lists of the National Board of Review and the New York Film Critics Circle and was successful at the North American box office, finishing eighth for the year, but due to its high production cost it lost $700,000. On the Beach was praised by critics. (Note: Variety evaluates it as "a solid film of considerable emotional, as well as cerebral, content" but adds "the fact remains that the final impact is as heavy as a leaden shroud.... All the personal stories are well-presented. The cast is almost uniformly excellent. Peck and Gardner make a good romantic team." The Hollywood Reporter enthused the film was "brilliantly executed.") (Note: Australian film writer Philip Davey says that at the time of release many critics "criticized the perceived 'unrealistic' sedate behavior of characters facing certain death...and, in some cases, the absence of a religious element." The Hollywood Reporter enthused the film was "brilliantly executed," but is reported to have "wondered at length why none of the characters showed any interest in religion as the world ends." Arthur Knight of Saturday Review observed "it is...difficult to believe that all [people] would remain as calm and self-possessed as the people have been here.... There is no looting, no licentiousness, no desperate last-chance fling.") In recent decades, critical opinion of On the Beach is mixed: some prominent critics asserting that the script is poor, (Note: Christopher Tookey says "It is hard to see why this incredibly turgid, cliche-ridden, melodramatic film garnered the critical acclaim it did." Time Out says "Fine photography but the script is a typically numbing affair, and the cast, aside from Peck...seem totally out of their depth.") but some critics saying the acting, especially Peck, and cinematography are excellent, and that, overall, the film is powerful. (Note: TV Guide says it is "Flawed but moving" and "Though it occasionally goes over the top with melodrama and lacks some technical credibility, (it) remains a powerful, well-acted, deftly photographed film." Leonard Maltin says "Thoughtful...with fine performances by all.") Butler of AllMovie writes, "...[P]roblematic is the clichéd, almost soap-operatic relationship between Gregory Peck and Ava Gardner and the somewhat melodramatic handling of other sections of the film.... The cast helps tremendously. Peck has rarely been more stalwart.... Even decades after its release, Beach is a harrowing and devastating experience."

=== 1960–1964: Continued success ===
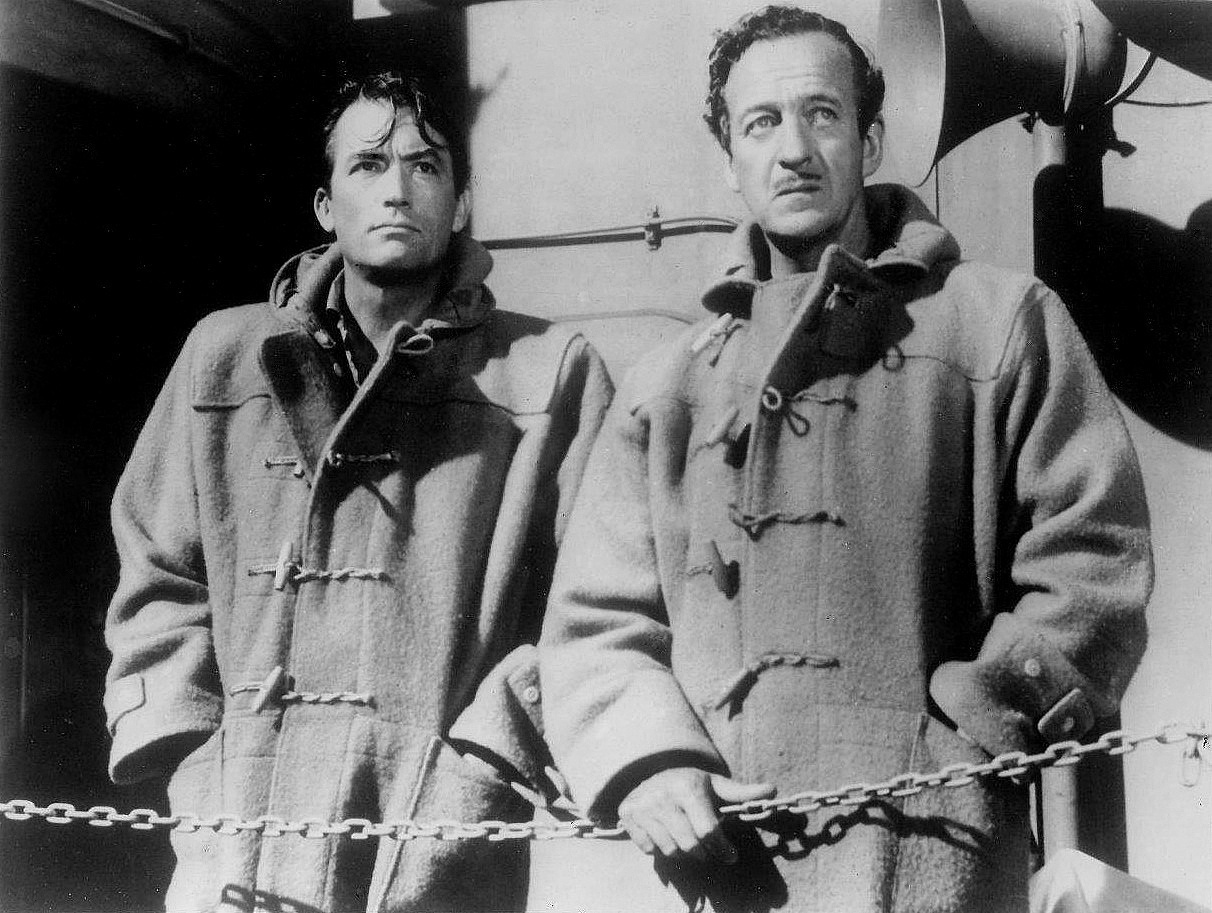
Peck and David Niven in The Guns of Navarone (1961)

Peck's first release of 1961 was The Guns of Navarone. A J. Lee Thompson-directed World War II drama, it depicts Peck as an expert mountain climber leading a six-man commando team seeking destroy two seemingly impregnable German artillery guns on Navarone Island. The team of specialists, which includes David Niven and Anthony Quinn, needs to destroy the guns so that British ships can evacuate 2,000 trapped British soldiers across the Aegean Sea. During filming Peck said that his team seems to defeat "the entire German army," which approaches parody, concluding that cast members had to "play their roles with complete conviction" to make the film convincing. The film was the top-grossing movie of 1961, and became "one of the most popular adventure movies of its day." It landed seven Academy Award nominations, winning for Best Special Effects; other accolades include the Golden Globe Award for Best Picture, Drama and the BAFTA for Best British Screenplay.

Critics praised The Guns of Navarone, naming it the best picture of the year in Film Daily's annual poll of critics and industry reporters in 1961. (Note: Variety said it was a "spectacular drama...and even, with its flaws, should have patrons firmly riveted throughout its lengthy narrative" adding that all the actors "turn in worthwhile performances," it has "terrific special effects and several socko situations" and that "a wonderfully directed and lensed storm segment and the final boffo climax nail-biting are just a few of the nail-biting highlights.") Bosley Crowther opined, "more emphasis is placed on melodrama than on character or credibility," that the characters are "all such predictable people you're likely to get bored with them before the guns are blown up," and "One simply wonders why Foreman...didn't aim for more complex human drama." He goes on to write it is a "robust action drama" and "For anyone given to letting himself be entertained by scenes of explosive action and individual heroic display, there should be entertainment in this picture for there is plenty of it.... Even though the picture runs more than two hours and a half, it moves swiftly and gets where it is going. J.Lee Thompson has directed it with pace." The New Yorker's film critic declared, it was "one of those great bow-wow...movies that are no less thrilling because they are so preposterous" confessing he "was held more or less spellbound all the way through this many-colored rubbish." Paul V. Peckly of The New York Herald Tribune wrote, "Peck may seem at times a trifle wooden and his German accent too obviously American...but his not too introspective, somewhat baffled manner is manly and fitted to the role he plays. In recent decades, most prominent critics or publications give it positive reviews (Note: TV Guide says it is a "stirring spectacle" and "great adventure...handled well by veteran director J. Lee Thompson, with strong cast support and excellent production values that make it all lavish, rich and often breathtaking" despite its "clichéd story, hackneyed characters and triumph-over-impossible-odds-finale." Jeremy Aspinall of Radio Times comments "This classic wartime adventure...maintains tension despite the film's epic length" also complimenting the acting. Ronald Bergen describes it as a "rip-roaring adventure" that is "spectacularly filmed" and "one of the best of its type." Tony Rayns of Time Out assert, "the ongoing debates about the morality of warfare that are scattered through (the movie) only serve to drag out the action climaxes." Christopher Tookey describes it as an "Old-fashioned but effective war movie, which would have been improved further by cutting some of the chat." Mike Mayo in Videohound's War Movies writes, behind the "often clunky mechanics of plot lies solid craftsmanship.... [D]irector J. Lee Thompson...handles the story with a finer touch.... [T]he production [has] a realistic, lived-in look that's more associated with "serious" black-and-white World War II movies than with escapism.")

Peck's next film was Cape Fear (1962), produced by Melville Productions. Peck portrays a lawyer whose witness testimony condemned Robert Mitchum's character to eight years in prison for sexual assault. Upon release, the sadistic Max Cady threatens to get back at Peck through his wife and daughter, and meticulously terrorizes the family. Peck was anxious to have Mitchum in the role of Cady, but Mitchum declined at first, only relenting after Peck and Thompson delivered a case of bourbon to Mitchum's home. Many cuts were made to the movie to satisfy censorship codes in the US and UK. The film grossed only $5 million at the North American box office, 47th for the year. Crowther and Variety gave Cape Fear solid reviews. (Note: Bosley Crowther wrote "A cold-blooded, calculated build-up of sadistic menace and shivering dread is accomplished with frightening adroitness.... Technically, it's a good job. Mr. Webb has prepared a tough, tight script and Mr. Thompson has directed in a steady and starkly sinister style. And Mr. Mitchum plays the villain with the cheekiest, wickedest arrogance and the most relentless aura of sadism that he has ever managed to generate. Mr. Peck is taut and tenacious." Variety said "As a forthright exercise in cumulative terror Cape Fear is a competent and visually polished entry.... There is nothing...which might provide some insight in Mitchum's behavior. Peck, displaying his typical guarded self, is effective, if perhaps less distraught over the prospect of personal disaster than his character might warrant.... Mitchum has no trouble being utterly hateful.") Both expressed satisfaction with Peck's performance, although Variety noted he could have been a little more stressed by the occurrences. Other reviews were mixed due to the movie's disturbing nature, including The New Yorker. In recent decades, reviews have been generally positive. (Note: Time Out writes "This superbly nasty thrill boasts great credentials.... Mitchum as the sadistic villain, Peck as the epitome of threatened righteousness...whooping music by Bernard Herrmann. If director Thompson isn't quite skilful enough to give the film its final touch of class (many of the shocks are just too planned), the relentlessness of the story and Mitchum's tangibly sordid presence guarantee the viewer's quivering attention." TV Guide says "Unforgettable villainy. Suspenseful and very frightening, thanks to Robert Mitchum's lethally threatening performance and the frightened reactions of a pro cast.... J. Lee Thompson directs at a clip, until the drawl toward the bayou climax, where the minutes feel like hours, and your heart sits in your throat. Peck is careful not to act the fear; he's an interesting foe for Mitchum." Jonathan Rosenbaum of Chicago Reader "…. better than the Scorsese remake – above all for Robert Mitchum's chilling performance...though its arguable still some distance from deserving its reputation as a classic." Brendon Hanley of AllMovie says Mitchum's role "comes in second in the sinister sweepstakes only to his chilling performance...in Night of the Hunter...Mitchum's Cad is...an untouchable, unstoppable, unrepentant corrupter of innocence...all with a sadistic smirk.... Director J. Lee Thompson...significantly scaled back his scope for this drama, and even the fight scenes at the end have a subdued, almost still aspect." Christopher Tookey sums up, "Straightforward, unpretentious yarn with memorable performances (especially from Robert Mitchum) and a fine Bernard Herrmann score.") Critics commented on Peck's performance, with TV Guide saying "Peck is careful not to act the fear; he's an interesting foe for Mitchum." After Cape Fear, Peck planned to make his directorial debut with They're a Weird Mob but eventually did not make the film.

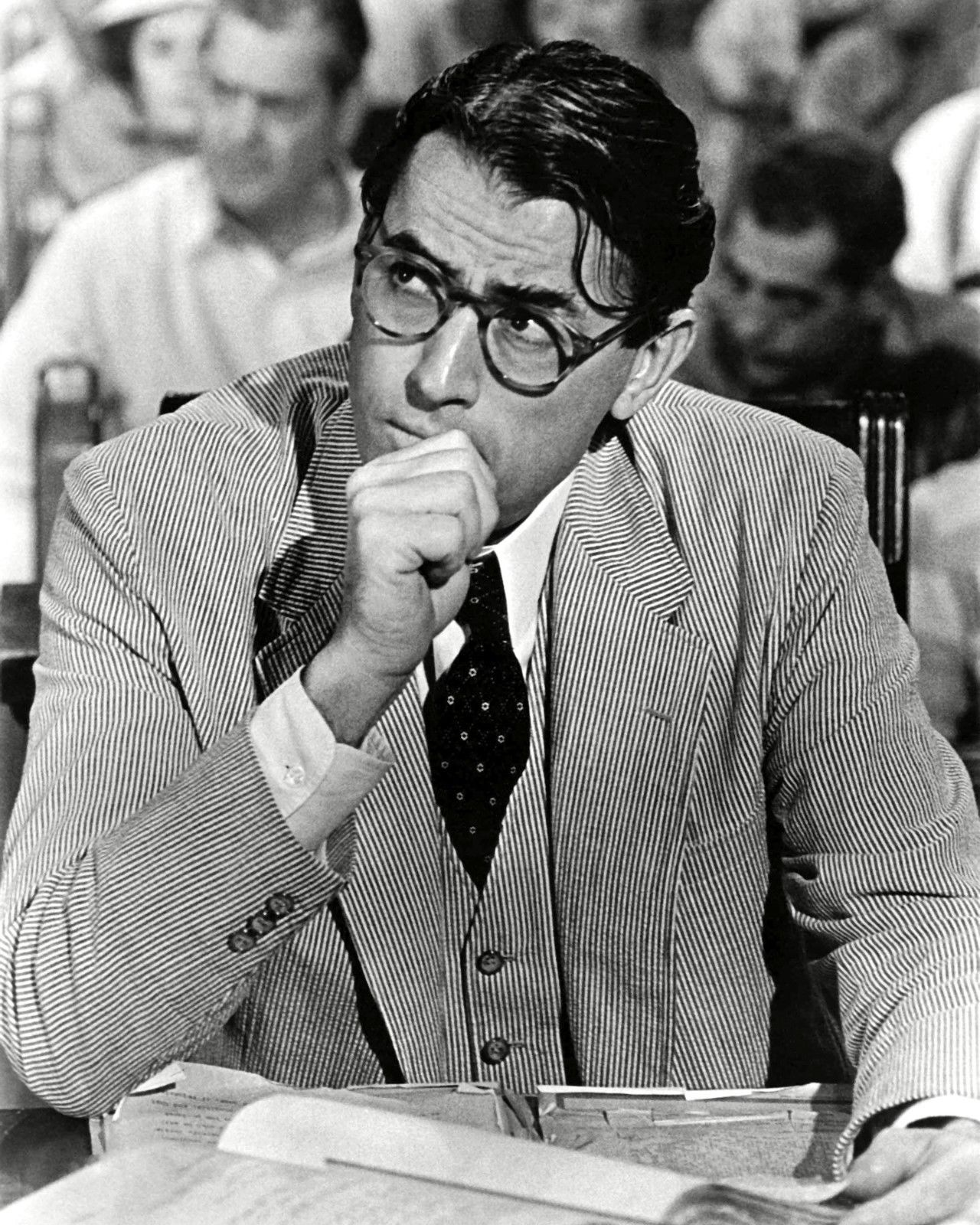
Peck as Atticus Finch in To Kill a Mockingbird (1962), for which he won the Academy Award for Best Actor

Peck's next role was in the 1962 film adaptation of Harper Lee's Pulitzer Prize-winning novel To Kill a Mockingbird, playing the role of kind and scrupulously honest lawyer-father, Atticus Finch. This performance saw his fifth and final Academy Award nomination, for which he won Best Actor. The film received a further seven nominations including for Best Picture, Director, and Cinematography, also winning Adapted Screenplay and Art Direction. At the Golden Globes, Peck won for Best Actor in a Drama, the film was nominated for Best Film and Director. It was also nominated for Best Film at the BAFTAs. (Note: There were no New York Film Critics Circle Awards that year due to a strike) The film was a commercial success as the sixth-highest-grossing film of the year. In 2003, Atticus Finch, as portrayed by Peck, was named the greatest film hero of the past 100 years by the American Film Institute. Peck would later say of To Kill A Mockingbird: "My favorite film, without any question."

When producer Alan J. Pakula and director Robert Mulligan approached Peck about taking the role of Atticus Finch in To Kill a Mockingbird, Peck agreed to read the book. He stated "I got started on it and of course I sat up all night and read straight through it.... I called them at about eight o'clock in the morning and said 'When do I start?'" (Note: Peck was not Universal Studios' first choice to play Atticus Finch in To Kill a Mockingbird; Rock Hudson was slated to play the part until Pakula and Mulligan became involved in the production and immediately thought Peck would be preferable. The three of them traveled to Monroeville, Alabama, to meet Harper Lee's father, and found the basis for the story to be accurate.) Peck did eventually request changes so that the film deviated somewhat from the book, mainly showing more scenes of Peck in the courtroom than were in the original rough cut, thus shifting the focus away from the children, and more towards Atticus Finch. (Note: After viewing a rough cut of the finished film, Peck wrote a memo to Universal, that included a statement "Atticus had no chance to emerge as courageous or strong" and amongst other things, requested that more footage of himself be inserted in place of some footage of Scout and Jem. As Peck's production company was footing a substantial portion of the production costs, most of his requests were fulfilled and the court room scenes cover about 30% of the film's length.) (Note: The initial aim was to shoot the film in Monroeville, Alabama; however, the town neighborhoods of the 1930s no longer existed, and the Monroeville Courthouse's courtroom had very poor acoustics which would make filming there very difficult. Mulligan took hundreds of photographs of homes and gardens in the South to capture its atmosphere. Production designer Henry Bumstead went to Monroeville for a tour of the town neighborhoods where Lee grew up to take in the atmosphere, and Lee also provided some photographs of her neighborhood from the 1930s. Universal had location scouts find clapboard houses from the right time period with the appropriate deteriorating appearance and the homes they found were just about to be demolished for a freeway. The Finch house was painstakingly put together with the pieces of several of the homes. Production designers went to Monroeville to take photographs and measurements of the actual courtroom.) Peck's performance was praised by critics. Variety wrote that the role was especially challenging for Peck but that he "not only succeeds, but makes it appear effortless, etching a portrayal of strength, dignity and intelligence." (Note: Variety's full analysis was "For Peck, it is an especially challenging role, requiring him to conceal his natural physical attractiveness yet project through a veneer of civilized restraint and resigned, rational compromise the fires of social indignation and humanitarian concern that burn within the character. He not only succeeds, but makes it appear effortless, etching a portrayal of strength, dignity, intelligence. Another distinguished achievement for an actor whose taste and high standards of role selectivity is attested to by the caliber of his films and performances throughout his career." Bosley Crowther stated Atticus Finch was "played superbly by Gregory Peck.") The Hollywood Reporter said "Peck gives probably the finest performance of his career, understated, casual, effective." Time posited "Peck, though he is generally excellent, lays it on a bit thick at times – he seems to imagine himself the Abe Lincoln of Alabama." Reviews in recent decades have similarly lauded Peck's performance, (Note: TV Guide says "Peck's peak...since its release, this...film has been warmly received by audiences responding to...the heroic image portrayed by Peck, a shining example of citizenship and affectionate fatherhood." Dan Jardine of AllMovie asserts "Oscar-winner Gregory Peck is ideal casting as Atticus, for his Lincoln-like integrity and intelligence perfectly serve the role. Peck hammers home the film's achingly authentic, timeless, and resonant plea for humanistic tolerance: The best way to understand another's problems is to get into his or her skin and walk around in it. Empire says "Peck gives a career-best turn, but true to the source, is understated enough to let the kids shine." Cara Frost-Sharratt asserts the "casting of Peck was clearly a stroke of genius.") with Film Monthly observing, "Gregory Peck's performance as lawyer Atticus Finch is just as beautiful, natural, and nuanced as the movie itself." Both Michael Gebert and Andrew Collins of Radio Times refer to Atticus Finch as the role that defined Peck's career.

=== 1965–2000: Mature years and later work ===
Peck served as the president of the Academy of Motion Picture Arts and Sciences in 1967, Chairman of the Board of Trustees of the American Film Institute from 1967 to 1969, Chairman of the Motion Picture and Television Relief Fund in 1971, and National Chairman of the American Cancer Society in 1966. He was a member of the National Council on the Arts from 1964 to 1966.

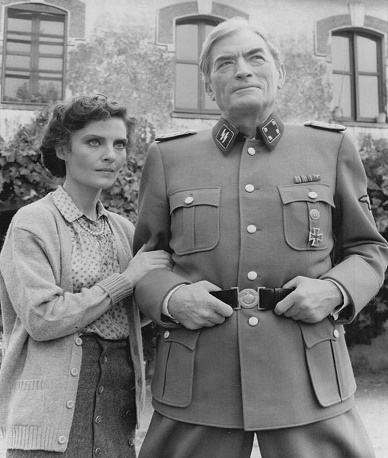
Peck with Olga Karlatos in The Scarlet and the Black (1983)

Peck's rare attempts at villainous roles were not acclaimed. Early on, he played the renegade son in the Western Duel in the Sun, and in 1978 the infamous Nazi doctor Josef Mengele in The Boys from Brazil. In the 1980s, Peck moved to television, where he starred in the mini-series The Blue and the Gray, playing Abraham Lincoln. He also starred with Christopher Plummer, John Gielgud, and Barbara Bouchet in the television film The Scarlet and the Black, about Monsignor Hugh O'Flaherty, a real-life Catholic priest in the Vatican who smuggled Jews and other refugees away from the Nazis during World War II.

Peck, Mitchum, and Martin Balsam all had roles in the 1991 remake of Cape Fear, directed by Martin Scorsese. In the remake, Peck played Max Cady's lawyer. His last prominent film role also came in 1991, in Other People's Money, directed by Norman Jewison and based on the stage play of that name. Peck played a business owner trying to save his company against a hostile takeover bid by a Wall Street liquidator played by Danny DeVito.

Peck retired from active film-making after the film. Peck spent the last few years of his life touring the world doing speaking engagements in which he would show clips from his movies and take questions from the audience. He came out of retirement for a 1998 mini-series version of one of his most famous films, Moby Dick, portraying Father Mapple (played by Orson Welles in the 1956 version), with Patrick Stewart as Captain Ahab, the role Peck played in the earlier film. It was his final performance, and it won him the Golden Globe for Best Supporting Actor in a Series, Miniseries, or Television Film. Peck had been offered the role of Grandpa Joe in the 2005 film Charlie and the Chocolate Factory, but died before he could accept it. The Irish actor David Kelly was then given the part.

== Politics ==
In 1947, while many Hollywood figures were being blacklisted for similar activities, Peck signed a letter deploring a House Un-American Activities Committee investigation of alleged communists in the film industry. A life-long Democrat, Peck was suggested in 1970 as a possible Democratic candidate to run against Ronald Reagan for the office of California Governor. Although he later admitted that he had no interest in being a candidate himself for public office, Peck encouraged one of his sons, Carey Peck, to run for political office. He was defeated both times by slim margins in races in 1978 and 1980 against Republican U.S. Representative Bob Dornan, another former actor.

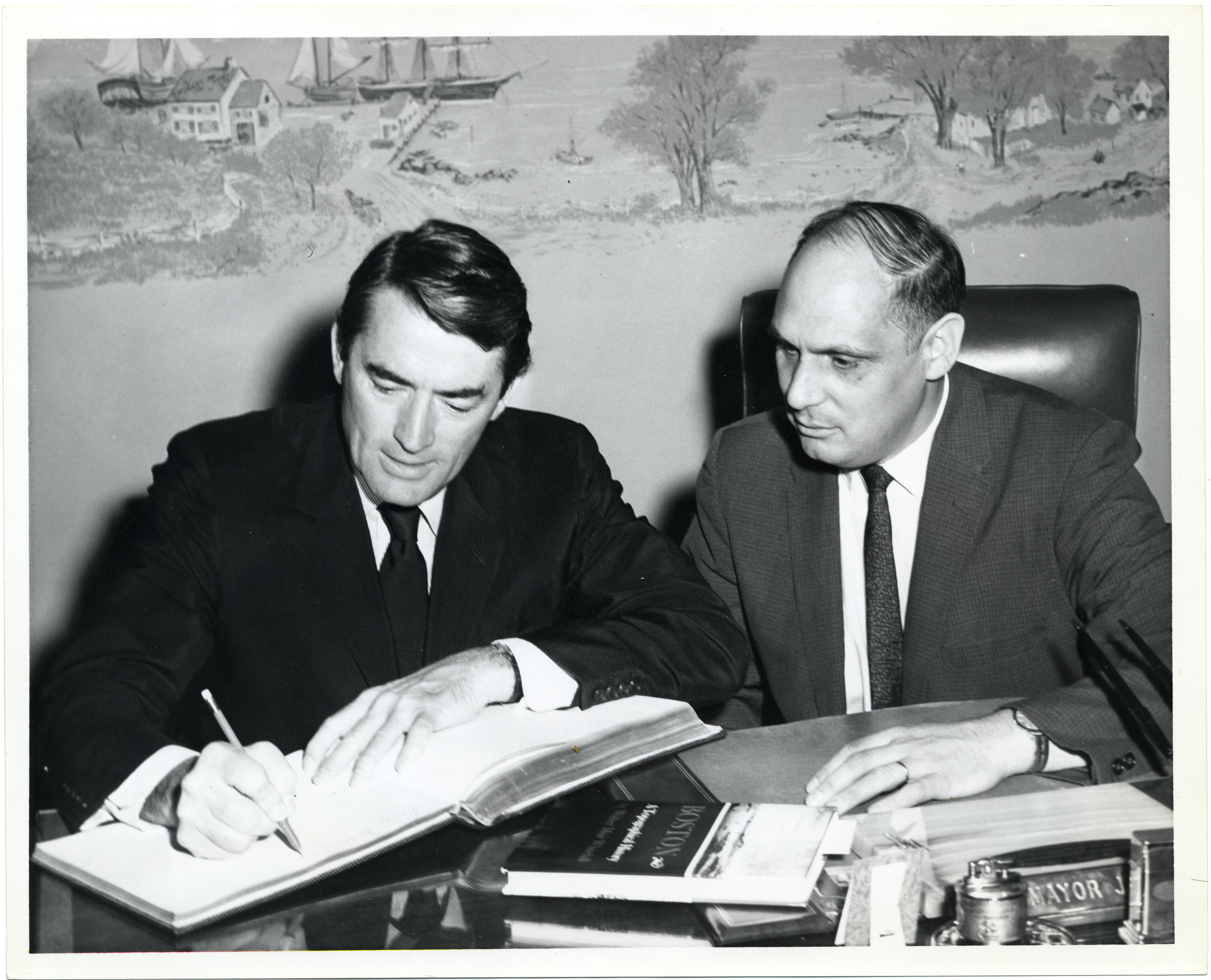
Peck with Deputy Mayor of Boston Henry Scagnoli c. 1968

Peck revealed that former President Lyndon Johnson had told him that, had he sought re-election in 1968, he intended to offer Peck the post of U.S. ambassador to Ireland – a post Peck, owing to his Irish ancestry, said he might well have taken, saying, "[It] would have been a great adventure." The actor's biographer Michael Freedland substantiates the report, and says that Johnson indicated that his presentation of the Medal of Freedom to Peck would perhaps make up for his inability to confer the ambassadorship. President Richard Nixon placed Peck on his "enemies list," owing to Peck's liberal activism.

Peck was outspoken against the Vietnam War, while remaining supportive of his son, Stephen, who fought there as a Marine officer forward observer. In 1972, Peck produced the film version of Daniel Berrigan's play The Trial of the Catonsville Nine about the prosecution of a group of Vietnam protesters for civil disobedience. Despite his reservations about American general Douglas MacArthur as a man, Peck had long wanted to play him on film, and did so in MacArthur in 1976. Peck was a close friend of French president Jacques Chirac.

In 1978, Peck traveled to Alabama, the setting of To Kill a Mockingbird, to campaign for Democratic U.S. Senate nominee Donald W. Stewart of Anniston, who defeated the Republican candidate, James D. Martin, a former U.S. representative from Gadsden. In 1987, Peck undertook the voice-overs for television commercials opposing President Ronald Reagan's Supreme Court nomination of judge Robert Bork. Bork's nomination was defeated. Peck was also a vocal supporter of a worldwide ban of nuclear weapons, and a life-long advocate of gun control.

Documents declassified in 2017 show that the National Security Agency had created a biographical file on Peck as part of its monitoring of prominent US citizens.

== Personal life ==
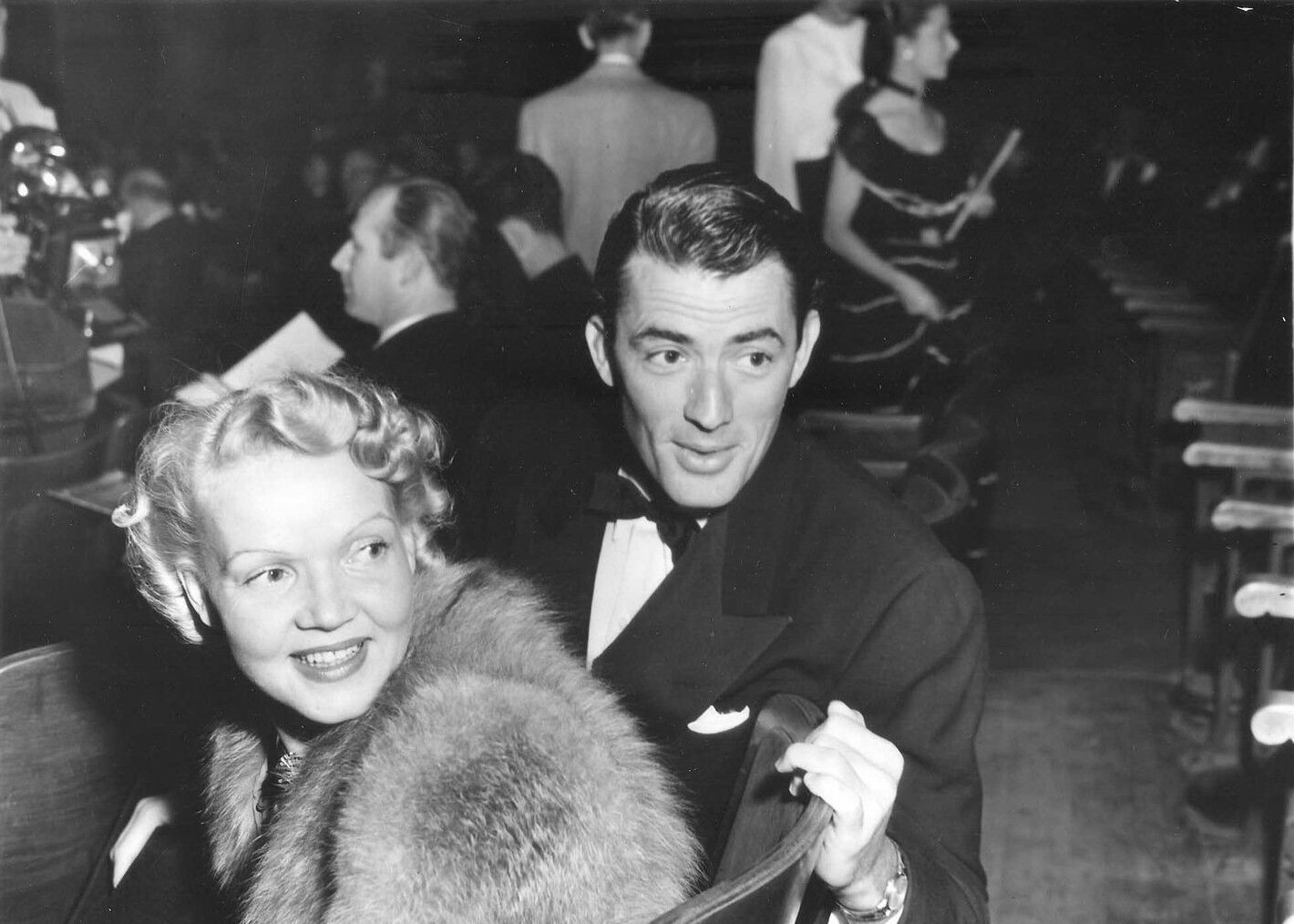
Peck with his first wife Greta Kukkonen in the 1940s

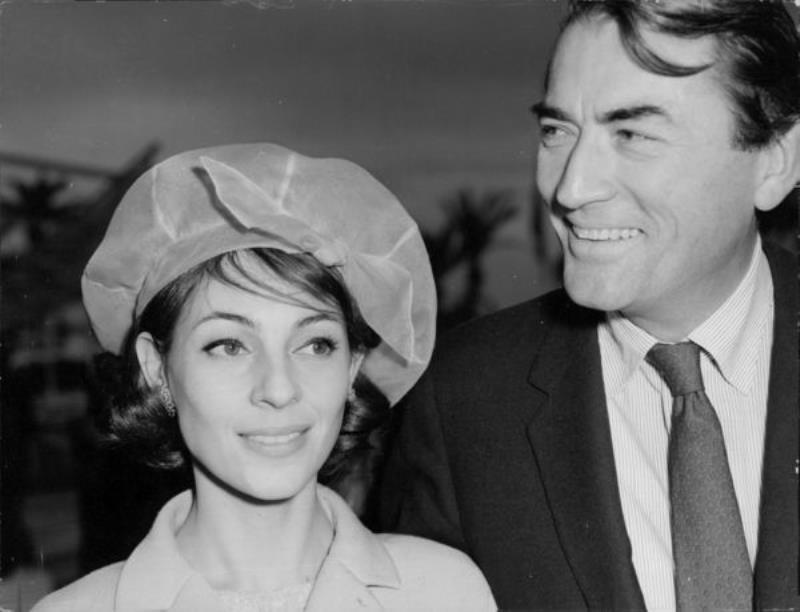
Peck with his second wife Veronique in 1963

In October 1942, Peck married Finnish American Greta Kukkonen (1911–2008), with whom he had three sons: Jonathan (1944–1975), Stephen (b. 1946), and Carey Paul (b. 1949). They were divorced in December 1955. Peck's eldest son was found dead in his home on June 26, 1975, in what authorities believed was a suicide. "It's the most terrible thing that has happened to me in my life," Peck said once. "You never get over a thing like that."

During his first marriage, Peck had a brief affair with Spellbound co-star Ingrid Bergman. He confessed the affair to Brad Darrach of People in a 1987 interview, saying: "All I can say is that I had a real love for her, and I think that's where I ought to stop.... I was young. She was young. We were involved for weeks in close and intense work."

On New Year's Eve in 1955, the day after his divorce was final, Peck married Véronique Passani (1932–2012), a Paris news reporter who had interviewed him in 1952 before he went to Italy to film Roman Holiday. He asked her to lunch six months later, and they became inseparable. They had a son, Anthony Peck (b. 1956), and a daughter, Cecilia Peck (b. 1958). The couple remained married until Peck's death. His son Anthony is a former husband of supermodel Cheryl Tiegs. Peck had grandchildren from both marriages. One of his grandsons from his first marriage is actor Ethan Peck.

Peck was the owner of thoroughbred steeplechase race horses. In 1963, Owen's Sedge finished seventh in the Grand National. Another of his horses, Different Class, raced in the 1968 Grand National. The horse was favored, but finished third.

Peck's hobbies included gardening, reading, and listening to music, including classical, opera and jazz. Peck and his wife often hosted dinners in support of the arts and humanitarian or social justice causes.

Peck was Roman Catholic, and once considered entering the priesthood. Later in his career, a journalist asked Peck if he was a practicing Catholic. Peck answered: "I am a Roman Catholic. Not a fanatic, but I practice enough to keep the franchise. I don't always agree with the Pope.... There are issues that concern me, like abortion, contraception, the ordination of women...and others." His second marriage was performed by a justice of the peace, not by a priest, because the Church prohibits remarriage if the first spouse is still living and the first marriage was not annulled. Peck was a significant fund-raiser for the missionary work of a priest friend of his, Father Albert O'Hara, and served as co-producer of a cassette recording of the New Testament with his son Stephen.

== Death and legacy ==
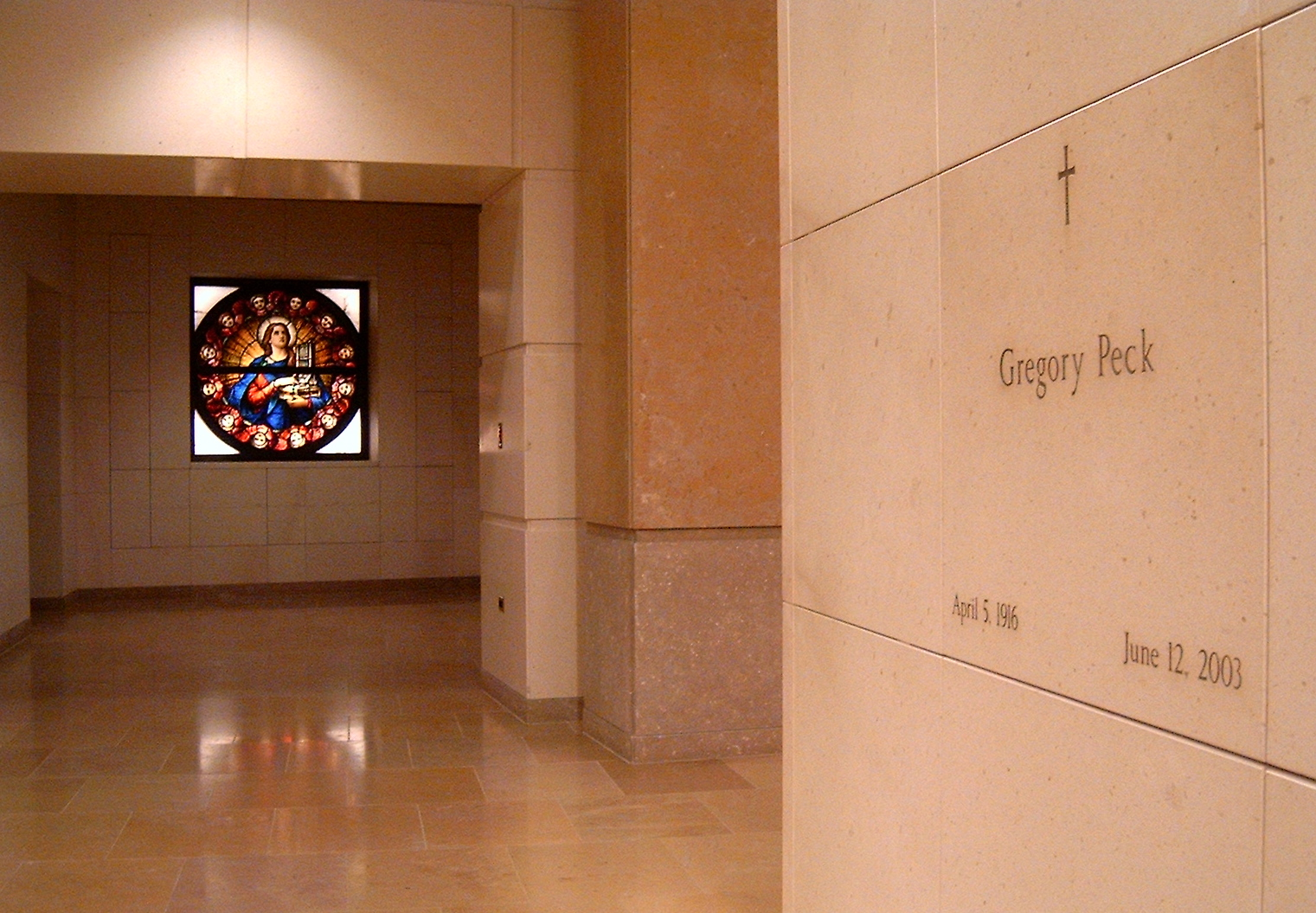
Peck's tomb at Cathedral of Our Lady of the Angels

On June 12, 2003, Peck died in his sleep from bronchopneumonia at the age of 87 at his home in Los Angeles. His wife Veronique was by his side.

Gregory Peck is entombed in the Cathedral of Our Lady of the Angels mausoleum in Los Angeles. His eulogy was read by Brock Peters, whose character, Tom Robinson, was defended by Peck's Atticus Finch in To Kill a Mockingbird.

The Gregory Peck Award for Cinematic Excellence was created by the Peck family in 2008 to commemorate their father by honoring the life's work of a director, producer or actor. Originally presented at the Dingle International Film Festival in his ancestral home in Dingle, Ireland, since 2014 the award has been presented at the San Diego International Film Festival in the city where Peck was born and raised. Recipients include Gabriel Byrne, Laura Dern, Alan Arkin, Annette Bening, Patrick Stewart and Laurence Fishburne.

== Acting credits and awards ==
According to the American Film Institute, the Academy of Motion Picture Arts and Sciences, and the Hollywood Foreign Press Association, Peck's most significant works include Days of Glory (1944), The Keys of the Kingdom (1945), Spellbound (1945), The Yearling (1946), Gentleman's Agreement (1947), Twelve O'Clock High (1949), The Gunfighter (1950), The Snows of Kilimanjaro (1952), Roman Holiday (1953), The Big Country (1958), Moby Dick (1956), Designing Woman (1957), The Guns of Navarone (1961), Cape Fear (1962), To Kill a Mockingbird (1962), Arabesque (1966), Mackenna's Gold (1969), The Omen (1976) and Old Gringo (1989). Among his television projects are The Blue and the Gray (1982) The Scarlet and the Black (1983) and Moby Dick (miniseries 1998). On stage, Peck appeared in Gas Light at the La Jolla Playhouse and provided a voice-over for The Will Rogers Follies at the Palace Theatre.

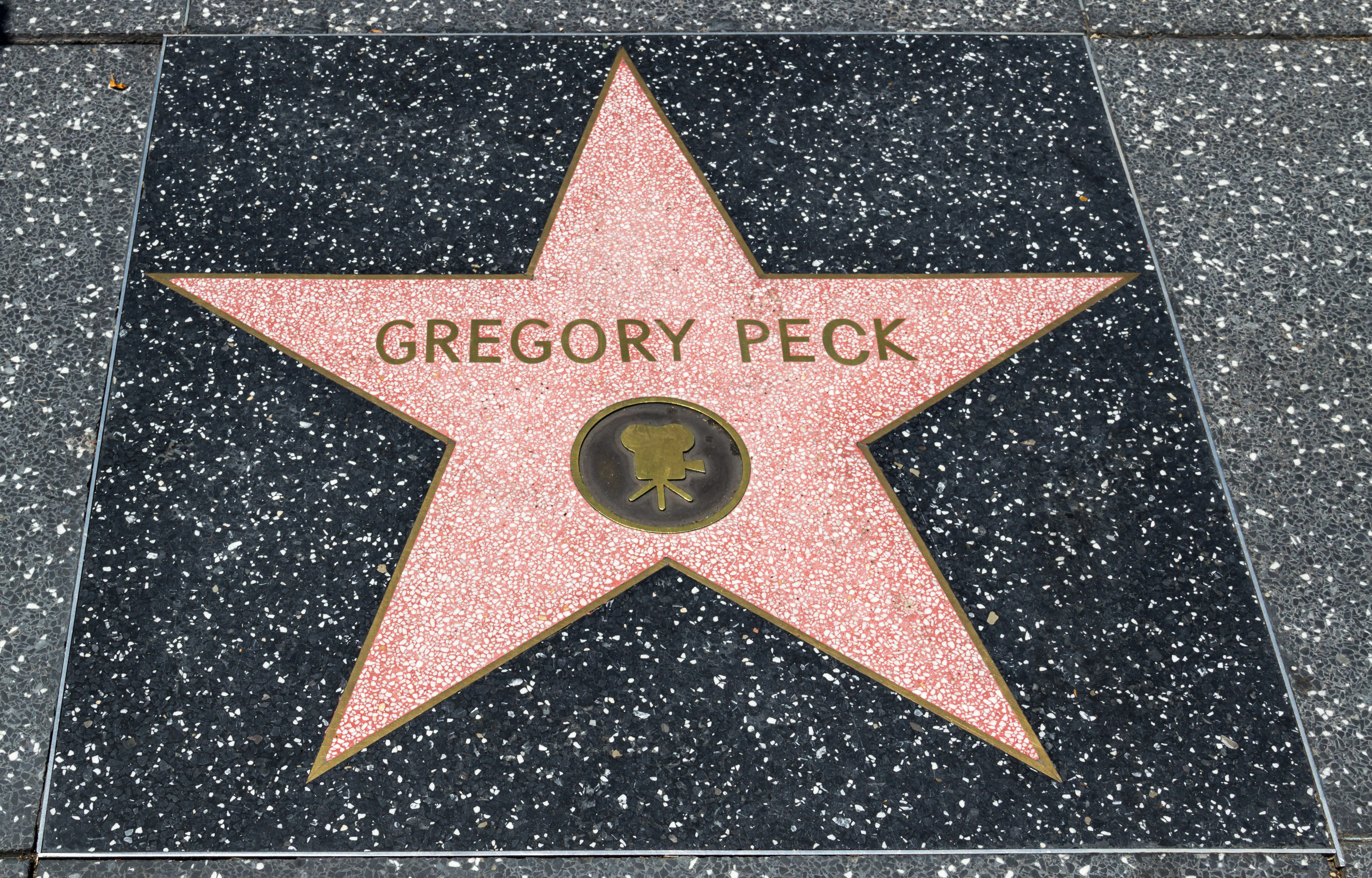
Peck's star on the Hollywood Walk of Fame

Peck received five total Academy Award nominations for The Keys of the Kingdom (1945), The Yearling (1946), Gentleman's Agreement (1947) and Twelve O'Clock High (1949) before winning Best Actor for his performance in To Kill a Mockingbird (1962). In 1967, he received their Jean Hersholt Humanitarian Award. He received eight competitive nominations for Golden Globe Awards that recognised his work in The Yearling (1946), To Kill a Mockingbird (1962), Captain Newman, M.D. (1964), MacArthur (1977), The Boys from Brazil (1978) and the 1998 miniseries Moby Dick. Peck's five wins included the Golden Globe for Best Actor twice as well as one Golden Globe Award for Best Supporting Actor – Series, Miniseries or Television Film, and he was honored with their Cecil B. DeMille Award in 1969.

In 1969, President Lyndon B. Johnson honored Peck with the Presidential Medal of Freedom, the nation's highest civilian honor. In 1998, Peck received the National Medal of Arts from President Bill Clinton for his contributions to acting. During his lifetime, he also was a recipient of the AFI Life Achievement Award, the Screen Actors Guild Life Achievement Award and the Kennedy Center Honors. For his contribution to the motion picture industry, Gregory Peck has a star on the Hollywood Walk of Fame at 6100 Hollywood Boulevard. In November 2005, the star was stolen, and has since been replaced.

== Archives ==
Peck donated his personal collection of home movies and prints of his feature films to the Film Archive of the Academy of Motion Picture Arts and Sciences in 1999. The film material at the Academy Film Archive is complemented by printed materials in the Gregory Peck papers at the Academy's Margaret Herrick Library.

== See also ==
- List of Presidential Medal of Freedom recipients

== Bibliography ==
- Fishgall, Gary (2002), Gregory Peck: A Biography, New York: Simon & Schuster, ISBN 0-684-85290-X
- Freedland, Michael (1980), Gregory Peck: A Biography, New York: W. Morrow, ISBN 0-688-03619-8
- Haney, Lynn (2005), Gregory Peck: A Charmed Life, New York: Da Capo Press, ISBN 1-861-05824-1
- McGilligan, Patrick (2004), Alfred Hitchcock: A Life in Darkness and Light, New York: HarperCollins Publishers Inc.

Non-profit organization positions
Preceded by Arthur Freed	President of Academy of Motion Pictures, Arts and Sciences; 1967–1970	Succeeded by Daniel Taradash
