= Michael Freedland =

British biographer, journalist and broadcaster

- Born: Michael Rodney Freedland; 18 December 1934; Hackney, London, England
- Died: 1 October 2018 (aged 83); Aberdeen, South Dakota, United States
- Occupations: Journalist and broadcaster

Michael Rodney Freedland (18 December 1934 – 1 October 2018) was a British biographer, journalist and broadcaster.

== Early life ==
Freedland was born in 1934 in Hackney, north London, to parents Dave Freedland, manager of a menswear shop, and Lily (née Mindel). Freedland was raised in Luton, Bedfordshire. As a child, he showed an interest in newspapers and news. He left Luton Grammar School in 1951, at the age of 16.

== Career ==
Freedland was Jewish. He began his career as a journalist on local newspapers in 1951, after leaving school, initially working for The Luton News. He was reporting for the newspaper in 1957 when he was the only journalist present when prime minister Harold Macmillan made his declaration that Britons had "never had it so good". Later, he was on the staff of the Daily Sketch for a year, before turning freelance in 1961. His broadcasting career began in the following year, and he wrote for The Sunday Telegraph, The Spectator, The Guardian, The Observer and The Economist.

As a biographer, he specialised in Hollywood and its entertainers, plus some prominent British subjects. His book on Al Jolson, originally published in 1971, reached its eighth edition in 2007. Freedland wrote over forty books, mainly biographies. He wrote and presented programmes for BBC Radio 2 in the UK on his subjects, including Elvis Presley, Bob Hope and Judy Garland. Asked about what to include in an individual's life history, the immediate concern was the Garland book, he said in 2010: "I am a great believer in telling it as it was. I am very certain of the need for warts and all. How else can you tell a full rounded story?"

Freedland's books included more general histories. Witch Hunt in Hollywood: McCarthyism's War On Tinseltown is an account of the activities of Senator Joseph McCarthy and (the not directly connected) House Un-American Activities Committee. In Freedland's view: "For Communist read Jew. The hearings ... were as much (some would say more) antisemitic as anti-Communist. Hollywood was chosen for the attack because of the great publicity value the movie capital offered. It was also a great opportunity to get at the Jews of Hollywood."

His radio show You Don't Have To Be Jewish began in 1971. Initially broadcast by BBC Radio London, and later by LBC, it was gradually extended in length and ran for 24 years. In 2021, BBC Sounds, with the help of BBC Archives, rebroadcast fifty episodes of the programme.

Ben Helfgott: The Story of One of the Boys (2018) was the first of his books to relate to the Holocaust. Helfgott, a weightlifter who competed for Britain in the Melbourne and Rome Olympics, was a survivor of the Buchenwald and Theresienstadt concentration camps.

== Personal life and death ==
Freedland was married for 52 years to Sara Hocherman, who died in 2012. One of the couple's daughters, Fiona, was a solicitor specialising in medical negligence claims; she died in 2014. Their middle child, daughter Dani, worked as a successful charity fundraiser, while their son is the journalist and thriller writer Jonathan Freedland. Like his son, Michael Freedland was a regular contributor to The Jewish Chronicle. His Confessions of a Serial Biographer, an autobiography, appeared in 2005.

At the time of his death, Freedland was working on a biography of the Hollywood lawyer Charles "Chuck" Levy. This had taken him to Aberdeen, South Dakota, where he experienced a fatal heart attack and died in his hotel room on 1 October 2018, aged 83. He was survived by his son Jonathan and daughter Dani.
