= Marina Zenovich =

American filmmaker

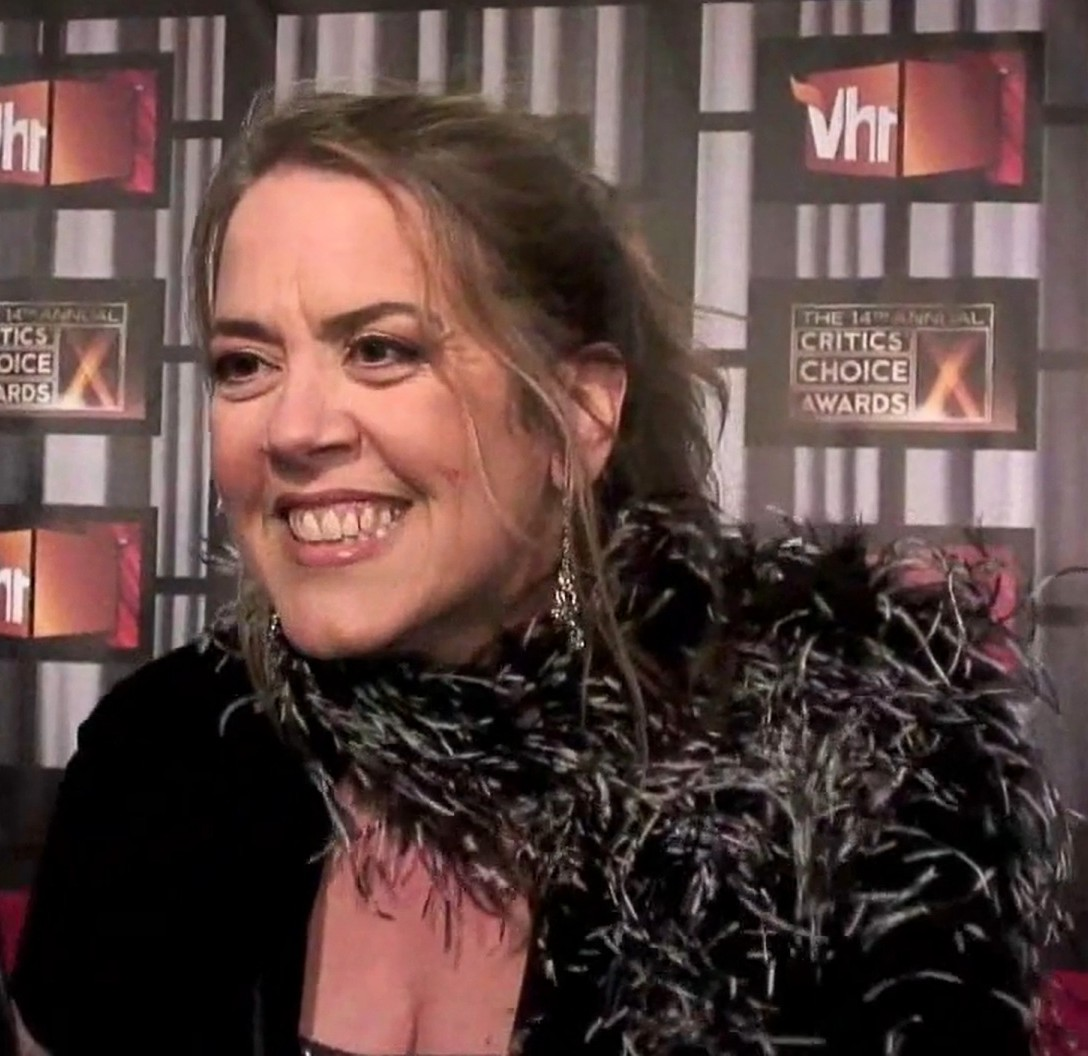
- Zenovich in 2009
- Born: Fresno, California, U.S.
- Occupation: Documentary filmmaker
- Notable work: LANCE; Robin Williams: Come Inside My Mind; Richard Pryor: Omit the Logic; Roman Polanski: Wanted and Desired
- Spouse: P. G. Morgan
- Children: 1
- Parent(s): George N. Zenovich; Vera "Kika" Zenovich
- Website: www.marinazenovichfilm.com

Marina Zenovich is an American filmmaker specializing in biographical portraits of comedians, entertainers and public figures entangled in scandals or personal turmoil, as well as investigative examinations of institutional failures and media frenzies. Her films include I'm Chevy Chase and You're Not, LANCE, Robin Williams: Come Inside My Mind, Richard Pryor: Omit the Logic and Roman Polanski: Wanted and Desired, which won two Emmy awards.

== Early life and education ==
Zenovich was born in Fresno, California. She is the daughter of George N. Zenovich, a former California State Senator and Judge of Serbian heritage, and Vera "Kika"” Zenovich, who was born in Dubrovnik, Croatia. Her sister is actress Ninon Zenovich (aka Ninon Aprea). The Fifth District Court of Appeals Courthouse in Fresno is named after her father. When he died in 2013, she made a film for the memorial service to celebrate his life.

Zenovich graduated from Bullard High School in Fresno, California. Zenovich first studied drama at the University of Southern California and then switched majors, graduating with a degree in journalism. During college, she worked for Hollywood producer Mike Frankovich and also in the press department of the Los Angeles Olympic Organizing Committee. Following graduation, Zenovich moved to New York City, where she acted in short films and off-Broadway plays. Zenovich studied acting at the William Esper Studio in Manhattan, furthering her studies with Ron Burrus and Stella Adler. She later acted in several movies including Robert Altman's The Player and actress Talia Shire's One Night Stand. Zenovich's voiceover work includes Alex Gibney's Going Clear: Scientology and the Prison of Belief. She is also the voice of a rubber band in the 2011 children's film Bands on the Run.

In 1997, Zenovich began working as a segment producer on John Pierson's TV series Split Screen, which was broadcast on the Independent Film Channel. Due to her work on Split Screen, she became interested in becoming a director and working on feature documentaries.

== Career ==
=== Films ===
==== Independent's Day ====
Shot in 1996–1997, Zenovich's first film Independent's Day premiered at the Slamdance Film Festival in 1998. The documentary was inspired by the three filmmakers who founded the aforementioned festival, after being rejected by the more established Sundance Film Festival. Zenovich's documentary explores the struggles of independent filmmakers and includes interviews with Steven Soderbergh, Greg Mottola, Tom DiCillo, Eric Schaeffer, Sydney Pollack, Parker Posey, Roger Ebert, John Pierson, among others.

While screening Independent's Day on the festival circuit, Zenovich met investor Bob Sturm, who hired her to work at his new film company, Catch 23 Entertainment. Zenovich started out in the development department and went on to become Senior Vice President of Film Development & Production, while continuing to make documentaries on the side.

The documentary aired on the Criterion Channel on October 10, 2022. (Trailer)

==== Who Is Bernard Tapie? ====
Zenovich's next film idea came about in 1997, after a screening at the Directors Guild of America, where French filmmaker Claude Lelouch introduced his film Hommes, femmes, mode d'emploi. Lelouch mentioned that the star of the film, Bernard Tapie, was in jail, prompting Zenovich to find out why. She spent several years going back and forth to Paris, shooting footage for Who Is Bernard Tapie? Unable to get an interview with Tapie, Zenovich filmed herself as she tried to contact the actor/businessman, hoping to get his attention. The 2001 documentary, with Steven Soderbergh as its executive producer, was aired on the Sundance Channel and as an episode of the BBC's Storyville series. Zenovich was also profiled in The New York Times about her quest to make the documentary.

The documentary aired on the Criterion Channel on October 10, 2022. (Trailer)

==== Estonia Dreams of Eurovision! ====
Zenovich also appeared on camera in her following film Estonia Dreams of Eurovision! She traveled to Tallinn, Estonia to document the preparations leading up to hosting the Eurovision Song Contest. The 2003 film was broadcast as part of the BBC series Arena and also on the Sundance Channel. It was produced by Vikram Jayanti.

The documentary aired on the Criterion Channel on October 10, 2022. (Trailer)

==== Art in Progress (TV series) ====
In the early 2000s, Zenovich worked on the series Art in Progress for Gallery HD, an arts channel part of Voom HD Networks. She traveled the world filming profiles of artists as they prepared for major exhibitions. Her episodes include: Tim Noble & Sue Webster: Now Here (in Athens, Greece); Julian Schnabel in Naples; David Lynch in Milan; Vanessa Beecroft in Berlin; Robert Wilson: Video Portraits (in Paris); Takashi Murakami (in Los Angeles); John Baldessari (in Belgium); Damien Elwes (in Santa Monica); and Sam Maloof (in Claremont).

==== Roman Polanski: Wanted and Desired ====
Zenovich came up with the subject of her next documentary film, after reading a story in the Los Angeles Times in 2003. The article questioned whether director Roman Polanski could re-enter the United States, if nominated for an Oscar for The Pianist. Polanski had fled the U.S. in the late 1970s after pleading guilty to unlawful sex with a minor.

Five years in the making, Zenovich's Roman Polanski: Wanted and Desired premiered at the 2008 Sundance Film Festival, receiving wide media attention. The film's editor Joe Bini won the award for Best Editing. The documentary received a Special Screening at the Cannes Film Festival. Entertainment Weekly called it "A film of rare fascination and power." The film also won two Primetime Emmys for Outstanding Directing for Nonfiction Programming and Outstanding Writing for Nonfiction Programming (shared with Joe Bini & P.G. Morgan). Wanted and Desired was selected by the National Board of Review as one of the Best Documentaries of 2008.

==== Roman Polanski: Odd Man Out ====
Soon after its release, Polanski's legal team used the film Roman Polanski: Wanted and Desired as part of their argument for reopening the 30 year old case. Since her documentary about the film director was being used as evidence, Zenovich decided to continue shooting the story. The result was a follow-up film, Roman Polanski: Odd Man Out.

The second documentary was originally meant to examine how the central characters felt about the incident. Zenovich filmed Samantha Gailey and her mother in Hawaii, and also planned on meeting Polanski for an interview. However, two months before the scheduled interview, Polanski was arrested in Switzerland on his way to receive a Lifetime Achievement Award at the Zurich Film Festival. As a result, Zenovich's follow-up film became linked to a big international news story.

Roman Polanski: Odd Man Out debuted at the Toronto Film Festival in 2012 and subsequently played at the New York Film Festival, also airing on the Showtime network. (Trailer)

==== Richard Pryor: Omit the Logic ====
Zenovich's next film, Richard Pryor: Omit the Logic, was made for Showtime and executive produced by Roy Ackerman. The documentary features interviews with Robin Williams, Mike Epps, Bob Newhart, Mel Brooks, David Banks, Whoopi Goldberg and an interview with Pryor's lawyer Skip Brittenham. Zenovich came up with the film's title during her interview with writer David Banks, who stated: "With Richard, you have to omit the logic."

The documentary premiered at the Tribeca Film Festival in 2013 where Zenovich participated in a discussion with Tracy Morgan, Wyatt Cenac, Walter Mosley and Jennifer Pryor. The panel was moderated by writer Jacob Bernstein. Omit the Logic won the NAACP Image Award for Best Television Documentary. The film's editor Chris A. Peterson was also nominated for a Primetime Emmy for Outstanding Editing.

==== Fantastic Lies ====
In 2014, Zenovich addressed another controversial story, the 2006 Duke Lacrosse scandal. The resulting film, Fantastic Lies, was aired on ESPN's 30 for 30 series and earned positive reviews. The documentary premiered at SXSW Film Festival in 2016, also receiving nominations for Best Sports Documentary and Best TV/Streaming Documentary at the Critics Choice Awards. (Trailer)

As RealScreen's Daniele Alcinii noted, "The director began by attempting to reach those involved with the criminal case – from members of the lacrosse team to Duke University staff – through emails and cold calls. Although her interview requests were largely ignored, Zenovich managed to break through when former Duke lacrosse player Kyle Dowd coaxed his mother Patricia Dowd to share her experiences on the months-long trial. Once she gained Dowd’s trust, Zenovich was further able to persuade Kathy and Philip Seligmann, parents of Reade Seligmann, and Kevin Finnerty, father of Collin Finnerty, to open up on film."

Zenovich explained how she reached out for interviews on NPR's Morning Edition: "They knew the film was happening. They knew that I was trying to get them through their lawyers, through their parents. But on some level, I really respected the fact that they just want to move on. It's unfortunate that they will be labeled as the Duke lacrosse boys, but unfortunately, that's what happens."

Zenovich clarifies her own take on the situation in a Sports Illustrated interview by Richard Deitsch: “For me this case is about prosecutorial misconduct and false accusations mixed with a prosecutor and police department that did not have anyone to answer to,” Zenovich said. “The issues of prosecutorial misconduct and police misconduct are very alive and very scary for people who end up that in situation. I hope people will say, 'Hey, next time I won’t jump to conclusions' but I think we live in a time where they do." Crystal Mangum, the accuser who admitted to lying entirely about the 2006 events in 2024, agreed to participate but she was jailed during Zenovich's production schedule and the North Carolina penal administrators vetoed Mangum from appearing. Both disgraced and disbarred ex-DA Mike Nifong and his main media excuser William Cohan wanted to participate and were bluntly told by Zenovich that they would not be part of the project.

The film ends with this anonymous quote from one of the players that was falsely accused during the Duke lacrosse rape hoax:

"Not a month goes by when I am not reminded of the damage those accusations have had on my reputation and the public's perception of my character. Sometimes only time can heal wounds."

— anonymous Duke lacrosse player, 30 for 30, Fantastic Lies (2016)

==== Water & Power: A California Heist ====
In 2016, Zenovich took on the California water crisis. Her documentary Water & Power: A California Heist premiered at the Sundance Film Festival in 2017 and was nominated for the Grand Jury prize. The film also played in theaters and aired on the National Geographic Channel.

==== Robin Williams: Come Inside My Mind ====
In 2018, Zenovich returned to Sundance for the third time with her HBO feature documentary, Robin Williams: Come Inside My Mind. The film played six sell-out screenings and received positive reviews. It was also screened at the Nantucket Film Festival and had a first HBO broadcast on July 16, 2018. That same summer, the documentary was shown at the Hamptons International Film Festival SummerDocs, accompanied by a discussion with Zenovich and Q&A host Alec Baldwin. Variety described the film as being "sharp-edged, humane, and deeply researched enough to take you closer to the manic engine of Williams’ brilliance and pain".

The documentary celebrates the life and career of comedian Robin Williams, who died in 2014. Zenovich recorded interviews with Whoopi Goldberg, David Letterman and Billy Crystal, among others. She also included outtakes and little known clips from Williams' stand-up routines, after sifting through a large amount of archival footage. Describing the process as laborious yet amazing, Zenovich stated that, "Anytime you make a movie, no matter how many you've made, it's like you’re doing it for the first time."

==== LANCE ====
In 2020, Marina Zenovich once again returned to Sundance with her two-part film LANCE for ESPN. (Trailer)

Called "An unblinking, carefully crafted look at a damaged athlete's life after infamy that earns its three-hour-plus running time” in Daniel D'Addario's review for Variety, LANCE tells the rise and fall of Lance Armstrong. "In 'Lance,' we see him even if he somehow, still, cannot see himself. The movie’s point is made most poignantly by the mere fact of Armstrong speaking to camera, and the degree of intimacy he shares with Zenovich even as she is working at entirely cross-purposes to the image-maintenance he’s still trying to do," notes D'Addario in his Variety review. "For Armstrong, being seen by the camera is of paramount importance. It’s one more lie he tells himself, and one that — as it generated a documentary of such moving texture and precision — the audience should feel fortunate that he did."

Rosy Cordero from Entertainment Weekly had this to say about the film: "LANCE dives into Armstrong's rise and fall, from winning seven consecutive Tour de France titles and beating cancer, to admitting to using performance-enhancing drugs and watching those titles get stripped away. Zenovich also interviews members of his inner circle, teammates, and rivals to explore the athlete's life from every angle."

Zenovich herself, in the same Entertainment Weekly piece, explained: "I was just really interested in him as a human being and viewed this as a character study on what it takes to kind of be this iconic sports figure who had such a rise and then this like incredibly dramatic fall."

==== Jerry Brown: The Disrupter ====
Jerry Brown: The Disrupter is a documentary about Governor Jerry Brown that premiered on November 3, 2022, opening San Francisco's SFFILM Doc Stories Film Festival and in New York at the Doc NYC Film Festival shortly afterwards. It was later shown on PBS as part of its "American Masters" biographical series, in the fall of 2023.

The SFFILM Docs festival website describes it as "Governor Jerry Brown has had a storied political life, and Marina Zenovich’s tremendous portrait of him captures the highs and lows, augmented by present-day interviews with her protagonist...From his early days in San Francisco as the son of Governor Pat Brown to his current work around climate change and nuclear threats, Zenovich’s timely film proposes a hopeful alternative to the current political morass."

The San Francisco Chronicle's G. Allen Johnson asked Jerry Brown for his thoughts on the film: "It's an opportunity for people to see a very interesting slice of California and even of the country,” Brown said of the film. “It's a history about me, but it's also a history about California and about the times. So I think it's very illuminating.”

In the same article, Johnson commented that '"A big reason why Brown trusted Zenovich was that he's known her since she was a kid. She is the daughter of the late George N. Zenovich, a former California State Assembly member and state senator who served in the California State Legislature under both Pat Brown, who was governor from 1959 to 1967, and Jerry Brown during his first stint as governor (1975-83). That and, as Brown said, “she was very persistent.”' (Trailer)

==== I'm Chevy Chase And You're Not ====
I'm Chevy Chase and You're Not premiered on January 1, 2026, on CNN.

A preview screening at the Jacob Burns Film Center in Pleasantville, New York, described the film as "bold, wickedly funny, and deeply human portrait of one of Hollywood’s great enigmas: a performer with outsized gifts who could make a nation laugh—but who could not always outrun his own contradictions—whose films still circulate in the zeitgeist, quoted and rediscovered by new generations...the film charts Chevy Chase’s rise from breakout Saturday Night Live phenomenon to box-office royalty and his equally spectacular fall from grace."

Nicole Sperling of The New York Times called it "honest but empathetic."

"As a documentary filmmaker," notes Owen Gleiberman for Variety, "Marina Zenovich has long been drawn to difficult celebrities, like Roman Polanski (she made two films about him) and Robin Williams, but it’s not just because she sees the drama in their turbulence (though that’s part of it). She also wants to grapple — and does, brilliantly — with what you might call the primal issue of politically incorrect artists." Zenovich said she was shocked by how rude Chase was (he insulted her with the first sentence he said when they met) but also that he was a fascinating mix of contradictions who was always interesting to parse.

==== The Truth and Tragedy of Moriah Wilson ====
The Truth and Tragedy of Moriah Wilson, a documentary about the life, death, and legacy of Moriah Wilson, premiered on Netflix April 3, 2026. The film world premiered at SXSW in March 2026. (Trailer)

John Anderson, of The Wall Street Journal, writes, "As true-crime stories go, this one is relatively fresh...Ms. Zenovich possesses the interviewer’s most valuable skill, knowing when to shut up.”

"Every so often when making a documentary you become inspired beyond words and this experience was that for me," Zenovich commented in the film's Netflix announcement. "I’m so honored to be able to show the love, strength and vulnerability that Moriah Wilson’s family and friends shared with us in telling this tragic story. They took their unimaginable grief and turned it into something deeply moving and inspiring."

"The film revisits the highly publicized investigation and trial—but focuses mainly on Wilson, exploring her life and her community, and the lasting impact of her death," Isadora Wandermurem writes in her review for Time (magazine). "Through interviews, archival footage, and courtroom material, the documentary reconstructs both the investigation and the emotional toll left behind."

“The 97-minute film bypasses the sensationalism of international manhunts to focus entirely on the inner life of its subject..." writes a Blaze Trends staff reviewer. "This is a massive paradigm shift for the genre.”

=== Documentary Series ===
Recent series include the Amazon Prime docuseries Desperately Seeking Soulmate: Escaping Twin Flames Universe (2023); The Way Down (TV series) (2021/2022); Netflix's D.B. Cooper: Where Are You?! (2022) and Roku's What Happens In Hollywood (2021), which Variety (magazine) described as "a candid 10-part docuseries that examines Hollywood’s role in framing society’s overall view of sex and sexuality" and featured "interviews with Robin Wright, Helen Hunt, Michelle Rodriguez, Minnie Driver, Melanie Griffith, Karyn Kusama, Catherine Hardwicke, Maha Dakhil Jackson, Adele Lim, Freida Pinto, Gina Prince-Bythewood and Rosemary Rodriguez." It premiered on Roku in August 2021. (Trailer)

== Memberships ==
Zenovich is an active member of the Academy of Motion Picture Arts and Sciences, the Academy of Television Arts & Sciences, and the Directors Guild of America.

== Awards and nominations ==
For Roman Polanski: Wanted and Desired, Zenovich won two Emmys for writing and directing for non-fiction programming. She also garnered one nomination for producing. At the Sundance Film Festival, the documentary was nominated for the Grand Jury Prize and won an award for film editing.

- 2017 – Sundance Film Festival – Water & Power: A California Heist
- 2016 – SXSW Film Festival – SXSW Gamechanger Award Nominee – Fantastic Lies
- 2016 – Critics Choice Award – Best Documentary Feature (TV/Streaming), Best Sports Documentary – Fantastic Lies
- 2013 – NAACP Image Award – Best Documentary – Richard Pryor: Omit the Logic
- 2009 – Emmy Winner – Writing for Non-Fiction Programming, Directing – Roman Polanski: Wanted and Desired
- 2009 – Emmy Nominee – Non-Fiction Special – Roman Polanski: Wanted and Desired
- 2008 – Sundance Film Festival – Documentary Film Editing Award – Roman Polanski: Wanted and Desired
- 2008 – Libertas Film Festival (Dubrovnik, Croatia) – Best Documentary Film – Roman Polanski: Wanted and Desired

== Festivals ==
- Sundance Film Festival – LANCE, Robin Williams: Come Inside My Mind; Water & Power: A California Heist; Roman Polanski: Wanted and Desired
- Hamptons International Film Festival's SummerDoc series: Robin Williams: Come Inside My Mind
- Munich International Film Festival – Robin Williams: Come Inside My Mind
- Karlovy Vary International Film Festival – Robin Williams: Come Inside My Mind
- Martha's Vineyard International Film Festival: Robin Williams: Come Inside My Mind
- Provincetown International Film Festival – Robin Williams: Come Inside My Mind
- Nantucket Film Festival – Robin Williams: Come Inside My Mind
- Cannes Film Festival – Roman Polanski: Wanted and Desired
- New York Film Festival – Roman Polanski: Odd Man Out
- Toronto Film Festival – Roman Polanski: Odd Man Out
- Tribeca Film Festival – Richard Pryor: Omit the Logic
- SXSW Film Festival – The Truth and Tragedy of Moriah Wilson, The Way Down, Independent's Day, Fantastic Lies
- Slamdance Film Festival – Independent's Day
- Los Angeles Film Festival – Who Is Bernard Tapie?
- Santa Barbara International Film Festival – Independent's Day
- IDFA – Independent's Day; Who Is Bernard Tapie?; Richard Pryor: Omit the Logic
- Sheffield International Film Festival – Richard Pryor: Omit the Logic
- Deauville Film Festival – Who Is Bernard Tapie?; Roman Polanski: Wanted and Desired
- Torino Film Festival – Roman Polanski: Wanted and Desired
- Edinburgh International Film Festival – Roman Polanski: Wanted and Desired
- Zurich Film Festival – Roman Polanski: Wanted and Desired; Roman Polanski: Odd Man Out
- Melbourne International Film Festival – Roman Polanski: Wanted and Desired
- Oldenburg International Film Festival – Who Is Bernard Tapie?
- Libertas Film Festival – Roman Polanski: Wanted and Desired

== Filmography ==
- 1997 – Independent's Day
- 2001 – Who Is Bernard Tapie?
- 2003 – Estonia Dreams of Eurovision!
- Early 2000s – Art in Progress (TV series)
- 2008 – Roman Polanski: Wanted and Desired
- 2012 – Roman Polanski: Odd Man Out
- 2013 – Richard Pryor: Omit the Logic
- 2014 – Fantastic Lies
- 2016 – Water & Power: A California Heist
- 2018 – Robin Williams: Come Inside My Mind
- 2020 – LANCE
- 2022 - Jerry Brown: The Disrupter
- 2023 – Desperately Seeking Soulmate: Escaping Twin Flames Universe
- 2026 – I'm Chevy Chase and You're Not
- 2026 - The Truth and Tragedy of Moriah Wilson

== Personal life ==
Zenovich is married to the British writer and producer P.G. Morgan. They have one son.
