= Valentino Returns =

- Directed by: Peter Hoffman
- Written by: Leonard Gardner
- Based on: "Christ Has Returned to Earth and Preaches Here Nightly" by Leonard Gardner
- Produced by: Peter Hoffman; David Wisnievitz
- Starring: Frederic Forrest; Veronica Cartwright; Jenny Wright; Barry Tubb
- Cinematography: Jerzy Zieliński
- Edited by: Denine Rowan
- Distributed by: Skouras Pictures
- Release date: July 21, 1989 (New York City)
- Running time: 90 minutes
- Country: United States
- Language: English
- Box office: 15.954

Valentino Returns is a 1989 American romantic drama film written by Leonard Gardner, directed by Peter Hoffman and starring Frederic Forrest, Veronica Cartwright, Jenny Wright and Barry Tubb. It is Hoffman's feature directorial debut and based on Gardner's short story "Christ Has Returned to Earth and Preaches Here Nightly."

== Cast ==
- Frederic Forrest as Sonny Gibbs
- Veronica Cartwright as Patricia 'Pat' Gibbs
- Barry Tubb as Wayne Gibbs
- Jenny Wright as Sylvia Fuller
- Leonard Gardner as Lyle
- David Packer as Messner
- Seth Isler as Harry Ames

== Production ==
The movie was filmed in and around Stockton and Newman, and was funded by its director Peter Hoffman. It found an advocate in John Pierson, who recommended it for inclusion in the 1988 Sundance Film Festival. However, in his book Spike, Mike, Slackers, & Dykes, Pierson explains that Hoffman could not finish post-production on time:

He’s spent years editing his feature, spending millions of dollars of family money in the process. Occasionally he’d call me up to let me know that he’d trimmed a few frames from the opening shot and thought that it changed the entire film. Once invited to Sundance, I assumed he’d settle down and meet the deadline. But Hoffman was so possessed that he couldn’t stop tinkering. He pulled out–a second cancellation.

== Release ==
The film was released at the 68th Street Playhouse in New York City on July 21, 1989.
