= In the Soup =

1992 film by Alexandre Rockwell

- Directed by: Alexandre Rockwell
- Written by: Tim Kissell; Alexandre Rockwell
- Produced by: Jim Stark; Hank Blumenthal; Chosei Funahara
- Starring: Seymour Cassel; Steve Buscemi; Jennifer Beals
- Cinematography: Phil Parmet
- Edited by: Dana Congdon
- Music by: Mader
- Distributed by: Triton Pictures
- Release dates: January 22, 1992 (Sundance); October 23, 1992 (New York City)
- Running time: 93 minutes
- Country: United States
- Language: English
- Budget: $800,000
- Box office: $256,249

In the Soup is a 1992 independent comedy directed by Alexandre Rockwell, and written by Rockwell and Sollace Mitchell (credited as Tim Kissell). It stars Steve Buscemi as Aldolfo Rollo, a self-conscious screenwriter who has written an unfilmable 500-page screenplay and who is looking for a producer.

== Plot ==
Tortured by self-doubt, financial ruin, and unrequited passion for his next door neighbor, Aldolfo Rollo places an ad offering his mammoth screenplay to the highest bidder. In steps Aldolfo's "guardian angel" Joe, a fast-talking, high-rolling gangster who promises to produce the film but has his own unique ideas regarding film financing.

== Cast ==
- Steve Buscemi as Aldolfo Rollo
- Seymour Cassel as Joe
- Jennifer Beals as Angelica Pena
- Pat Moya as Dang
- Will Patton as Skip "Skippy"
- Sully Boyar as Old Man
- Steven Randazzo as Louis Barfardi
- Francesco Messina as Frank Barfardi
- Jim Jarmusch as Monty
- Carol Kane as Barbara
- Stanley Tucci as Gregoire
- Rockets Redglare as Guy
- Elizabeth Bracco as Jackie
- Debi Mazar as Suzie
- Sam Rockwell as Paulie
- Paul Herman as E-Z Rent-A-Car Clerk

== Production ==
Facing financial struggles as a first-time filmmaker in New York City, writer-director Alexandre Rockwell found himself in a challenging situation, admitting to being penniless and even selling his saxophone to acquire more film stock. A person named Frank responded to one of his advertisements and took a liking to him, generously offering to cover the cost of one of his movies. Rockwell "loosely based" this film on that incident. In an interview, Rockwell stated he started production with $15,000.

Principal photography predominantly occurred in New York City. Although shot on color film, Rockwell had no intention of releasing a color version in American theaters. Influenced by the stylized films of the 1930s and inspired by French directors François Truffaut and Jean-Luc Godard, Rockwell deliberately opted for a high-contrast black-and-white palette. This choice aimed to impart a certain surreal quality to the images. The entire budget for the film, totaling $800,000, came from foreign investors. While color prints were available for foreign distributors and home video releases, the film's theatrical release in the United States maintained its black-and-white presentation.

Speaking about working with Rockwell on the film, Steve Buscemi said in 1993: "In the Soup was the first film that I had really worked with a director that closely because my character was so important to the film. Alex gave me a lot of responsibility for that character. Not that he didn’t have his ideas about this guy—which I tried to fulfill—but we were constantly discussing ideas. He’s very much an actor’s director, and a brilliant filmmaker."

== Reception ==
On the review aggregator website Rotten Tomatoes, 83% of 12 critics' reviews are positive, with an average rating of 7.3/10. Janet Maslin gave the film a positive review in The New York Times, describing it as "a droll, self-conscious fable with an unexpected heart of gold", praising director Rockwell for turning a "potentially myopic subject into a wild grab bag of offbeat characters and deadpan comic effects", as well as praising the cinematography and Cassel's performance.

== In popular culture ==
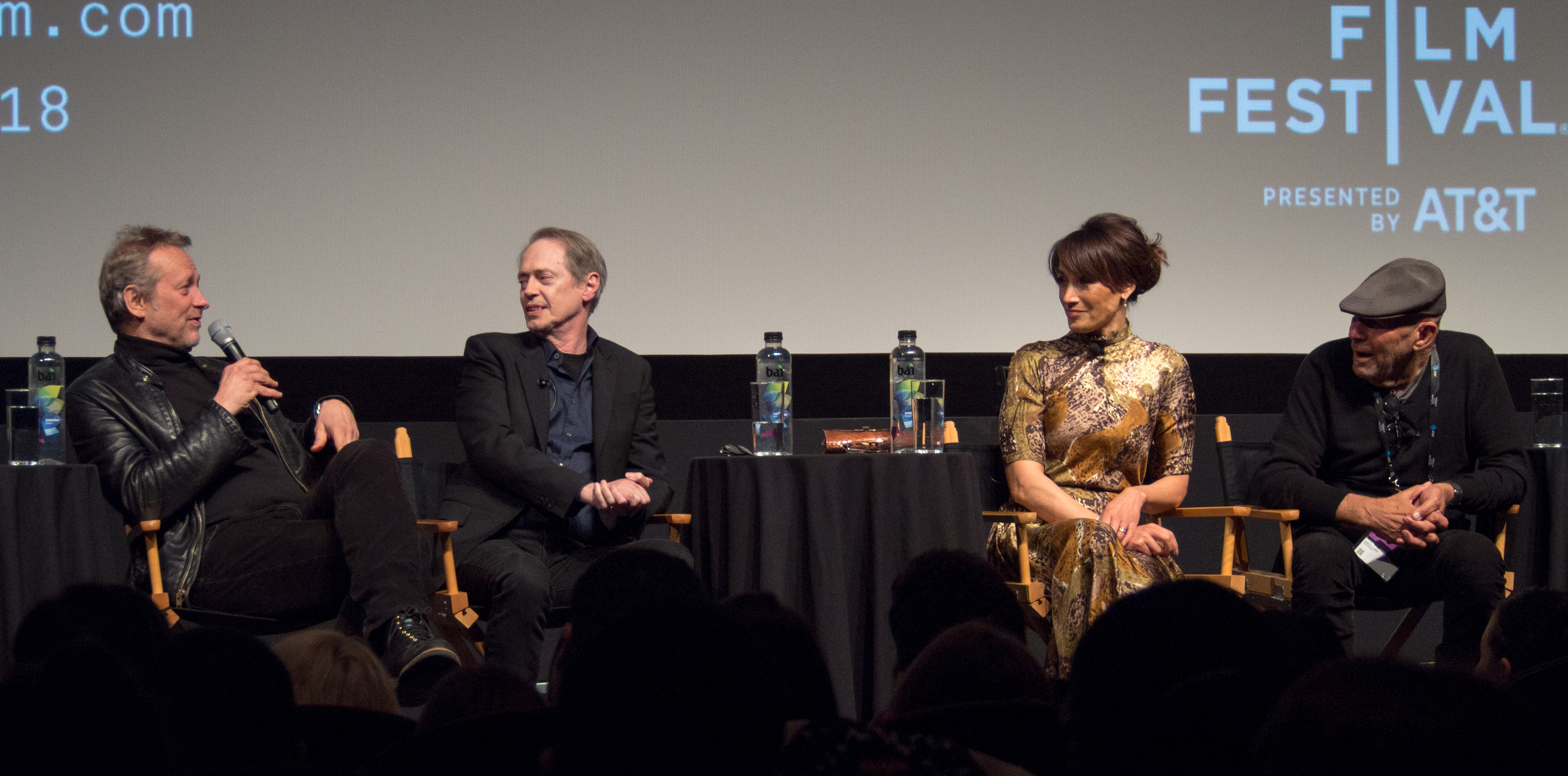
Alexandre Rockwell, Steve Buscemi, Jennifer Beals, and Phil Parmet following a screening at the 2018 Tribeca Film Festival

The film and its history are discussed in depth in John Pierson's account of the independent American film 'scene' of the late 1980s/early 1990s, Spike, Mike, Slackers, & Dykes: A Guided Tour Across a Decade of American Independent Cinema.

A Kickstarter project started in July 2017 with hopes of restoring the archival print and re-releasing the film for its 25th anniversary. The restored print was released by Factory 25 in 2018.

Awards
Preceded by Poison	Sundance Grand Jury Prize: U.S. Dramatic; 1992	Succeeded by Ruby in Paradise tied with Public Access
