= Richard Pryor: Omit the Logic =

2013 American biographical documentary film

- Film poster
- Directed by: Marina Zenovich
- Written by: P.G. Morgan; Chris A. Peterson; Marina Zenovich
- Based on: Life of Richard Pryor
- Produced by: Sara Hutchison
- Starring: Richard Pryor; Paul Mooney; Robin Williams; Whoopi Goldberg; Dave Chappelle; Mel Brooks
- Cinematography: Christine Burrill
- Edited by: Chris A. Peterson
- Music by: Mocean Worker
- Production company: Fresh One Productions
- Distributed by: BBC Worldwide; Showtime Networks
- Release date: April 26, 2013 (Tribeca)
- Running time: 83 minutes
- Country: United States
- Language: English

Richard Pryor: Omit the Logic is a 2013 American biographical documentary film directed by Marina Zenovich, writing with P.G. Morgan and Chris A. Peterson. The film is about the life of comedian and actor Richard Pryor.

The film premiered at the Tribeca Film Festival on April 26, 2013. It also aired in the United Kingdom on BBC Four as part of their Storyville strand of documentaries and in the United States on Showtime on July 31, 2013. The documentary won the NAACP Image Award for Best Television Documentary and editor, Chris A. Peterson, was nominated for a Primetime Emmy Award for Outstanding Editing. (Trailer)
