= I'm Chevy Chase and You're Not =

2026 American documentary film

- Official poster
- Directed by: Marina Zenovich
- Produced by: P. G. Morgan; Isabel San Vargas; Austin Wilkin
- Starring: Chevy Chase
- Cinematography: Wolfgang Held; Nick Higgins; Guy Mossman
- Edited by: Greg Finton
- Music by: Jeff Cardoni
- Production companies: CNN Films; Propagate Content; West Buttermilk; PMZ Pictures; Five All in the Fifth Entertainment
- Distributed by: CNN Films
- Release date: January 1, 2026 (United States)
- Running time: 97 minutes
- Country: United States
- Language: English

I'm Chevy Chase and You're Not is a 2026 American documentary film directed by Marina Zenovich. It explores the life and career of Chevy Chase.

It was broadcast on CNN on January 1, 2026, and released on HBO Max on January 31, 2026.

== Premise ==
Explores the life and career of Chevy Chase. Chase and his family, Dan Aykroyd, Beverly D'Angelo, Goldie Hawn, Lorne Michaels, Ryan Reynolds, Martin Short, Kevin Smith, and Patrick Ganino are among those interviewed in the film.

== Production ==
In May 2025, it was announced Marina Zenovich would direct a documentary revolving around Chevy Chase for CNN Films, after previously making projects on Richard Pryor, Robin Williams and Lance Armstrong. Zenovich described Chase as one of the rudest subjects she's interviewed. The cast and crew who previously worked with Chase on Community, including Dan Harmon, were asked to participate in the project, but declined, except for Jay Chandrasekhar.

== Release ==
It was broadcast on CNN on January 1, 2026, and was released on HBO Max on January 31, 2026. Sky Documentaries will distribute in the United Kingdom. (Trailer)

== Reception ==
On the review aggregator website Rotten Tomatoes, 93% of 14 critics' reviews are positive, with an average rating of 6.8/10. Metacritic, which uses a weighted average, assigned the film a score of 64 out of 100, based on six critics, indicating "generally favorable" reviews.

Nicole Sperling of The New York Times called it "honest but empathetic".

"As a documentary filmmaker," notes Owen Gleiberman for Variety, "Marina Zenovich has long been drawn to difficult celebrities, like Roman Polanski (she made two films about him) and Robin Williams, but it’s not just because she sees the drama in their turbulence (though that’s part of it). She also wants to grapple — and does, brilliantly — with what you might call the primal issue of politically incorrect artists."

John Anderson, another reviewer at Variety, stated: "To her credit, and that of her humanity, Ms. Zenovich has not made a hit piece. Her subject does a pretty good job of that on his own."

Daniel Fienberg of The Hollywood Reporter wrote, "The interviews with Chase provide very few notable details, but he's far from dead weight. The casual glimpses of his ordinary life in Bedford and public events like his annual Q&As on behalf of Christmas Vacation are sweet and human and capture the 82-year-old comic as a rascal, but not an asshole at all."

Richard Roeper of RogerEbert.com gave the film three out of four stars and wrote that it's "a gripping, funny, insightful, and at times melancholic look at a comedy legend who is in his 80s and still can be alternately charming and irascible in the span of a New York minute."

Chase's feud with Terry Sweeney is discussed in the film, with Chase stating "Terry Sweeney, he was very funny, this guy. I don't think he's alive anymore". Sweeney responded by stating: "Don't you think he is saying this and making himself look more like the ass he is?" Additionally, Chase's firing from Community is discussed, with Yvette Nicole Brown issuing a statement writing: "Anyone currently speaking FOR or ABOUT me with perceived authority is speaking without EVER speaking to me about the things they claim to know about. They actually don't really know me—at all."
