= Patrick Ganino =

American muralist from Connecticut

- Born: 1976 (age 49–50); Middletown, Connecticut, U.S.
- Occupation: Muralist
- Years active: 1990s–present
- Known for: Large-scale public and commissioned murals, decorative painting
- Movement: Contemporary mural art

Patrick Ganino is an American muralist based in Connecticut whose work includes large-scale public murals, commissioned portraiture, and community art projects throughout the state and beyond. He is best known for prominent murals along Connecticut transportation corridors, in downtown urban areas, and for portrait murals commissioned by private clients and public institutions.

== Background ==
Ganino grew up in Middletown, Connecticut, where he later established himself professionally as an artist and muralist. He began painting murals in the 1990s, initially working on decorative and commercial projects before expanding into large-scale public works.

== Career ==
Ganino’s career includes murals created for restaurants, movie theaters, public buildings, schools, and private residences. His work gained broader public visibility through large exterior murals in Middletown and along the Route 9 corridor in central Connecticut.

In 2016, Ganino painted a multi-story mural on the rear façade of the Metro Movies 12 theater in Middletown as part of a broader effort to beautify the Route 9 corridor. The mural incorporated portraits of local residents, including friends and family members, and was intended to reflect the surrounding community. Additional Route 9 murals followed, contributing to a series of public artworks designed to increase visual interest along the highway corridor.

In 2021, Ganino completed a 48-foot-tall mural in Stamford depicting a Waterside School student holding a sign reading “Dream Big.” The mural was commissioned as part of a redevelopment project in Stamford’s South End and was intended to emphasize education and aspiration.

Ganino has painted murals depicting Italian landscapes and vistas inspired by travel and heritage, including works installed in Connecticut locations. His work has also appeared in New York City, including a 2009 mural painted in a Brooklyn apartment airshaft as a gift to tenants from a building owner. In 2023, Ganino was among muralists selected to showcase New England landscapes in a public art installation at Bradley International Airport.

== Style and reception ==
Ganino’s murals typically emphasize realism and figurative portraiture, often incorporating local people or symbolic elements tied to a site’s purpose. He commonly works at large scale, using exterior walls as canvases to create highly visible public artworks.

Ganino’s murals have been cited by local officials and media outlets as contributing to urban revitalization and community identity. A 2025 Hartford Courant feature highlighted one of his murals for its specific social purpose and public engagement goals.

Ganino has painted or been commissioned by Mike Tyson, Rob Gronkowski, Chevy Chase, Dennis Rodman, Rosie O'Donnell, Post Malone, and Hulk Hogan. He discusses his friendship with Chevy Chase in the 2026 CNN documentary I'm Chevy Chase and You're Not.

== Health and recovery ==
In 2022, Ganino temporarily lost the use of his right arm due to a spinal condition that required medical treatment. Following surgery and rehabilitation, he returned to painting murals, documenting the recovery as part of public health awareness coverage.

== See also ==
- Mural
- Public art
