= The Girl: A Life in the Shadow of Roman Polanski =

Book by Samantha Geimer

- Author: Samantha Geimer
- Language: English
- Genre: Memoir
- Publication date: 2013

The Girl: A Life in the Shadow of Roman Polanski is a book written by Samantha Geimer about her life. She wrote it with the help of her lawyer Lawrence Silver and the writer Judith Newman. An excerpt was published by Today.com in 2013. A movie adaptation is currently being sold at the European Film Market.

== Reception ==
- The Guardian said that it was "fighting against reductive simplicity".
- Time Magazine called it "a thoughtful memoir".
- The New York Times said "[Geimer] is able to channel the bewilderment she felt while in Mr. Polanski's company, and the terror that came later."

== See also ==
- Roman Polanski: Wanted and Desired (2008 documentary film)
- Roman Polanski sexual abuse case
