= Water & Power: A California Heist =

- Directed by: Marina Zenovich
- Written by: Mark Arax
- Produced by: Jigsaw Productions
- Release date: January 23, 2017
- Running time: 87 minutes
- Country: United States
- Language: English

Water & Power: A California Heist is a 2017 American documentary film, directed by Marina Zenovich.

Premiering at the 2017 Sundance Film Festival, Water & Power: A California Heist was also a nominee for the Grand Jury Prize.

The documentary also had a theatrical run and was later shown on the National Geographic channel. (Trailer)

== Synopsis ==
The documentary's subject is the management of California's water resources. The film argues that political and financial mechanisms are being used to shift public water supplies into the control of financiers and private corporations, while Californian communities are deprived of access to safe drinking water.
