= Roman Polanski sexual abuse case =

Case of child sexual abuse against director Roman Polanski

People v. Roman Polanski
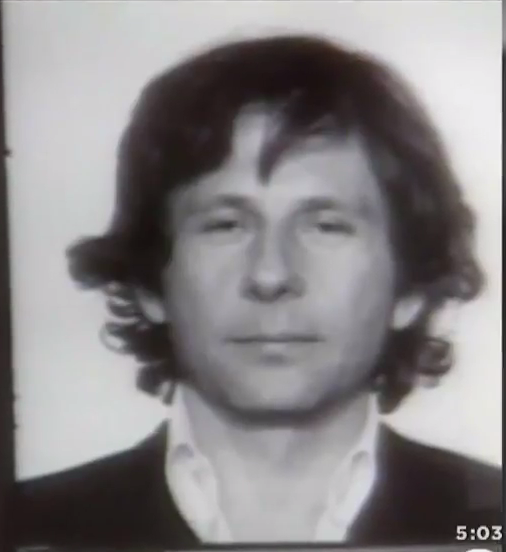
- Polanski's 1977 mug shot
- Court: Los Angeles County Superior Court
- Full case name: People of the State of California v. Roman Polanski
- Decided: August 1977
- Verdict: Pleaded guilty to unlawful sexual intercourse with a minor
- Charge: Rape by use of drugs; Perversion; Sodomy; Lewd and lascivious act upon a child under 14; Unlawful sexual intercourse with a female under the age of 18; Furnishing a controlled substance to a minor

Court membership
- Judge sitting: Laurence J. Rittenband

On March 10, 1977, Roman Polanski, a 43-year-old film director, was arrested and charged in Los Angeles with six offenses against Samantha Gailey (now Geimer), a 13-year-old girl: unlawful sexual intercourse with a minor, rape by use of drugs, perversion, sodomy, a lewd and lascivious act upon a child under the age of 14, and furnishing a controlled substance to a minor. At his arraignment, Polanski pleaded not guilty to all charges, but later accepted a plea bargain whose terms included dismissal of the five more serious charges in exchange for a guilty plea to the lesser charge of engaging in unlawful sexual intercourse with a minor.

Polanski underwent a court-ordered psychiatric evaluation, and was placed on probation. However, upon learning that he was likely to face imprisonment and subsequent deportation, Polanski became a fugitive from justice hours before he was due to be formally sentenced, fleeing first to England and then to France in February 1978. Since then, Polanski has mostly lived in France and has avoided visiting any countries likely to extradite him to the United States.

== Rape case ==
On March 10, 1977, Polanski faced six charges involving drugging and raping 13-year-old Samantha Jane Gailey (now Samantha Geimer). The charges were unlawful sexual intercourse with a female under the age of 18, rape by use of drugs, perversion, sodomy, a lewd and lascivious act upon a child under the age of 14, and furnishing a controlled substance to a minor. This ultimately led to Polanski's guilty plea to a different charge of unlawful sexual intercourse with a minor.

According to Geimer's testimony to the grand jury, Polanski had asked Geimer's mother (a television actress and model) if he could photograph the girl as part of his work for the French edition of Vogue, which Polanski had been invited to guest-edit. Her mother allowed a private photo shoot. Geimer testified that she felt uncomfortable during the first session, in which she posed topless at Polanski's request, and initially did not wish to take part in a second but nevertheless agreed to another shoot. This took place at the home of actor Jack Nicholson in the Mulholland area of Los Angeles.

When the crime was committed, Nicholson was on a ski trip in Colorado, and his live-in girlfriend Anjelica Huston, who was in L.A., had left the premises, but later returned while Polanski and Geimer were still there. Geimer was quoted in a later article as saying that Huston became suspicious of what was going on behind the closed bedroom door and began banging on it, but left when Polanski insisted they were finishing up the photoshoot. "We did photos with me drinking champagne", Geimer says. "Toward the end it got a little scary, and I realized he had other intentions and I knew I was not where I should be. I just didn't quite know how to get myself out of there." In a 2003 interview, she recalled that she began to feel uncomfortable after he asked her to lie down on a bed, and described how she attempted to resist. "I said, 'No, no. I don't want to go in there. No, I don't want to do this. No!', and then I didn't know what else to do", she stated, adding: "We were alone and I didn't know what else would happen if I made a scene. So I was just scared, and after giving some resistance, I figured well, I guess I'll get to come home after this."

Geimer testified that Polanski provided champagne that they shared as well as part of a Quaalude, and despite her protests, he performed oral sex on her, and penetrated her both vaginally and anally, each time after being told "no" and being asked to stop.

Describing the event in his autobiography, Polanski stated that he did not drug Geimer, that she "wasn't unresponsive", and that she did not respond negatively when he inquired as to whether or not she was enjoying what he was doing. The 28-page probation report submitted to the court by Kenneth Fare, his parole officer, and signed by deputy Irwin Gold, excused his behavior due to his creative genius and being an immigrant from a land with different morals, placed some of the blame on the victim and her mother, and concluded by saying that there was evidence "that the victim was not only physically mature, but willing". The officers report also quoted two psychiatrists' denial of Polanski being "a pedophile" or "sexual deviant".

Claiming to protect Geimer from a trial, her attorney arranged a plea bargain. Polanski accepted, and, under the terms of the agreement, the five initial charges were dismissed. Instead, Polanski pleaded guilty to the lesser charge of engaging in unlawful sexual intercourse with a minor.

=== Conviction and flight ===
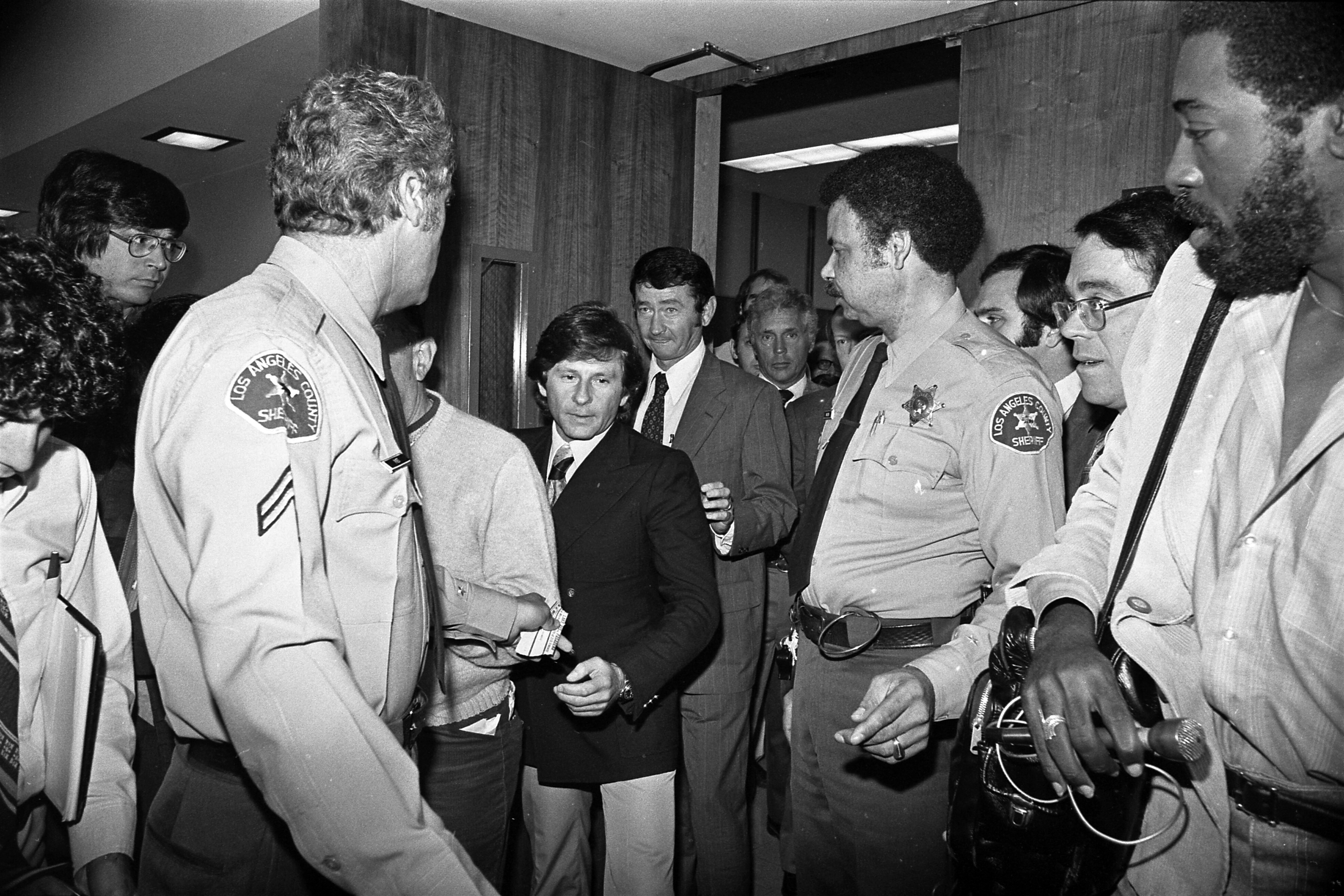
Polanski leaving a Santa Monica courtroom, October 1977

Under the terms of the plea agreement, the court ordered Polanski to report to a state prison for a 90-day psychiatric evaluation, but granted a stay to allow him to complete his current project. Under the terms set by the court, he traveled to Europe to complete filming. While in Europe for the filming of the upcoming 1979 remake of Hurricane, Polanski was photographed at Oktoberfest 1977 with his arms on multiple young girls and jars of beer around him. He was subsequently ordered to return to California and reported to Chino State Prison for the evaluation period beginning on December 19, 1977, and was released after 42 of the 90 scheduled days. Polanski's lawyers expected that Polanski would receive probation at the subsequent sentencing hearing, with the probation officer, examining psychiatrist, and the victim all recommending against prison time. During this time, on January 20, 1978, Polanski lost his job as the director of Hurricane.

Polanski's attorneys said that the presiding judge, Laurence J. Rittenband, suggested to them that he would send the director to prison and order him deported. According to the 2008 documentary Roman Polanski: Wanted and Desired, Los Angeles Deputy District Attorney David Wells showed Rittenband the photographs of Polanski partying in Munich with young girls, and said Polanski was being cavalier about the charges involving the 13-year-old girl. This would have constituted an ex parte communication, as although Wells was not an attorney of record in the case, he was technically a lawyer for one of the parties involved due to his work for the state of California. In response to the threat of imprisonment, Polanski became a fugitive from justice, fleeing the United States and going to England. Regarding the proposed sentencing, Rittenband said:

On January 30, Mr. Dalton and Mr. Gunson came to my chambers to discuss [Polanski's psychiatric report]. I told them that I had carefully read it and that I felt it was superficial, replete with many inaccuracies and factually unsupported conclusions, and was conspicuous more for what it failed to report than what it did report. I believe I used the word 'whitewash'. I stated that there was absolutely no mention in the report of any discussions which the counsellors and psychiatrists at Chino had with Mr. Polanski relating to the serious and aggravated charges of rape by drugs and alcohol, sodomy, and oral copulation of the 13-year-old victim. I believe I pointed out to them that a statement in the report "that throughout the experience (with the victim) Mr. Polanski seems to have been unaware that he was involving himself in a criminal offense, an isolated instance of naivete, unusual in a mature sophisticated man", was one of the most fatuous statements in a diagnostic report that I have ever read. I told Mr. Dalton that I did not propose to follow the recommendations which were for straight probation without any additional time in custody.

Polanski fled initially to London on February 1, 1978, where he maintained a residence. A day later he traveled on to France, where he held citizenship, thus avoiding the possibility of extradition to the United States by the United Kingdom. Consistent with its extradition treaty with the US, France can refuse to extradite its own citizens, and an extradition request later filed by US officials was denied. Polanski has never returned to England and later sold his home there. The US could still request the arrest and extradition of Polanski from other countries should he visit them, and Polanski has avoided visits to countries (such as the UK) that were likely to extradite him. In 1979, Polanski gave a controversial interview with novelist Martin Amis in which, discussing the case, he said "If I had killed somebody, it wouldn't have had so much appeal to the press, you see? But ... fucking, you see, and the young girls. Judges want to fuck young girls. Juries want to fuck young girls. Everyone wants to fuck young girls!" In 1983, Polanski told journalist Clive James that "I like the girls of that age. And because the girls of that age, for some reason like me." Later in this interview James asked, "Granted that you have this interest in young girls, and have never concealed that you have this interest in young girls, wasn't an incident like the one that happened more or less bound to happen eventually?" and Polanski responded, "Looking back at it, it probably was bound to happen, yes."

== Arrest in Zurich ==
On September 26, 2009, Polanski was detained by Swiss police at Zurich Airport while trying to enter Switzerland, in relation to his outstanding 1978 US arrest warrant. Polanski had planned to attend the Zurich Film Festival to receive a Lifetime Achievement Award. The arrest followed a request by the United States that Switzerland apprehend Polanski. US investigators had learned of his planned trip from a fax sent on September 22, 2009, from the Swiss Federal Department of Justice and Police to the United States Department of Justice's Office of International Affairs, which had given them enough time to negotiate with Swiss authorities and lay the groundwork for an arrest. Polanski had been subject of an Interpol red notice at the request of the United States since 2005.

The Swiss Federal Department of Justice and Police said Polanski was put "in provisional detention". An arrest warrant or extradition to the United States could be subject to judicial review by the Swiss Federal Criminal Court and then the Federal Supreme Court, according to a ministry spokesman. Polanski announced that he intended to appeal extradition and hired lawyer Lorenz Erni to represent him. On October 6, his initial request for bail was refused by the Federal Department of Justice and Police; a spokesperson commented, "we continue to be of the opinion that there is a high risk of flight."

On May 2, 2010, Polanski published an open letter entitled "I can remain silent no longer!" on Bernard-Henri Lévy's web site. In it, he stated that on February 26, 2010, Roger Gunson (the deputy district attorney in charge of the case in 1977, retired by the time of the letter) testified under oath before Judge Mary Lou Villar in the presence of David Walgren (the present deputy district attorney in charge of the case, who was at liberty to contradict and question Gunson) that on September 16, 1977, Judge Rittenband stated to all the parties concerned that Polanski's term of imprisonment in Chino constituted the totality of the sentence he would have to serve. Polanski also stated that Gunson added that it was false to claim (as the present district attorney's office does in their request for his extradition) that the time he spent in Chino was for the purpose of a diagnostic study.

On July 12, 2010, the Swiss court rejected the US request and released Polanski from custody.

=== Reactions to the arrest ===
In response to the arrest, the foreign ministers of both France and Poland urged Switzerland to release Polanski, who holds citizenship of both countries..

Over 160 film directors, actors, screenwriters, and producers signed a petition, started by Bernard-Henri Lévy, which urged Polanski's release. The petition was signed by many prominent individuals in the film industry.

Lévy's journal, La Règle du jeu, issued the following text for his petition:

"Apprehended like a common terrorist Saturday evening, September 26, as he came to receive a prize for his entire body of work, Roman Polanski now sleeps in prison.

He risks extradition to the United States for an episode that happened years ago and whose principal plaintiff repeatedly and emphatically declares she has put it behind her and abandoned any wish for legal proceedings.

Seventy-six years old, a survivor of Nazism and of Stalinist persecutions in Poland, Roman Polanski risks spending the rest of his life in jail for deeds which would be beyond the statute-of-limitations in Europe.

We ask the Swiss courts to free him immediately and not to turn this ingenious filmmaker into a martyr of a politico-legal imbroglio that is unworthy of two democracies like Switzerland and the United States. Good sense, as well as honor, require it."

A separate petition was also issued by the SACD (Société des Auteurs et Compositeurs Dramatiques), and received as many as 850 signatures. The SACD did not comment on Polanski's crime, stressing that their petition existed only to oppose the manner in which Polanski was arrested. The 2009 SACD petition for Polanski's release reads as follows:

"We have learned the astonishing news of Roman Polanski’s arrest by the Swiss police on September 26th, upon arrival in Zurich (Switzerland) while on his way to a film festival where he was due to receive an award for his career in filmmaking.

His arrest follows an American arrest warrant dating from 1978 against the filmmaker, in a case of morals.

Filmmakers in France, in Europe, in the United States and around the world are dismayed by this decision. It seems inadmissible to them that an international cultural event, paying homage to one of the greatest contemporary filmmakers, is used by the police to apprehend him.

By their extraterritorial nature, film festivals the world over have always permitted works to be shown and for filmmakers to present them freely and safely, even when certain States opposed this.

The arrest of Roman Polanski in a neutral country, where he assumed he could travel without hindrance, undermines this tradition: it opens the way for actions of which no one can know the effects.

Roman Polanski is a French citizen, and an international artist now facing extradition. This extradition, if it takes place, will be heavy in consequences and will take away his freedom.

Filmmakers, actors, producers and technicians — everyone involved in international filmmaking — want him to know that he has their support and friendship.

On September 16, 2009, Mr. Charles Rivkin, the US ambassador to France, received French artists and intellectuals at the embassy. He presented to them the new minister counselor for public affairs at the embassy, Ms Judith Baroody. In perfect French she lauded the Franco-American friendship and recommended the development of cultural relations between the two countries.

If only in the name of this friendship between our two countries, we demand the immediate release of Roman Polanski."

==== France ====
The arrest provoked particular controversy in France, where over the years many had downplayed the severity of Polanski's crime, highlighting instead his achievements as a film director and the many years that had passed since his flight from the United States.

The French minister of Culture and Communication, Frédéric Mitterrand, was vehement in his support, all the while announcing his "very deep emotion" after the questioning of the director, "a French citizen" and "a film-maker of international dimension": "the sight of him thrown to the lions for an old story which doesn't make much sense, imprisoned while traveling to an event that was intending to honor him: caught, in short, in a trap, is absolutely dreadful". These reactions resulted in political backlash in France.

Daniel Cohn-Bendit criticized these statements by Mitterrand, mainly on the grounds that it was a "matter of justice" in as much as "a 13-year-old girl was raped", adding "I believe that a minister of Culture, even if his name is Mitterrand, should say: I'll wait and read the files [myself]". "It is a tough call, since it is true that a 13-year-old girl was raped, that she said in her own words 'I complained [as it was happening]' and that she afterwards added 'I accepted a large sum of money' [to remain silent]".

Marc Laffineur, vice president of the French National Assembly and a member of President Nicolas Sarkozy's center-right party, criticized government ministers for rushing to judgment, saying the charges against Polanski should not be minimized.

Marine Le Pen, from the National Front, during a TV talk show on how to prevent sex crime recidivism, criticized Mitterrand for his support of Polanski. She recalled that in 2005, Mitterrand had published the book The Bad Life in which he wrote about having sex with male prostitutes in Thailand. In the book, Mitterrand was quoted, "I got into the habit of paying for boys ... All these rituals of the market for youths, the slave market excite me enormously. One could judge this abominable spectacle from a moral standpoint but it pleases me beyond the reasonable." Le Pen called for Mitterrand to resign.

The SACD, a society that collects authorship fees for film and theater works and redistributes them to authors, hosted an international petition in favor of Polanski. The petition stated:

By their extraterritoriality, film festivals the world over have always permitted works to be shown and for filmmakers to present them freely and safely, even when certain States opposed this.

A number of celebrities, most of them French, expressed their support for Polanski by means of a public manifesto, whose concluding statements were "Roman Polanski is a French citizen, an artist of international reputation, now threatened to be extradited. This extradition, if brought into effect, would carry a heavy load of consequences as well as deprive the film-maker of his freedom." The signatories concluded: "we demand the immediate release of Roman Polanski." Not all assessments coming from the French film-making mainstream have been openly partisan, however. Luc Besson, for instance, remarked: "I do not know the history of the trial. ... I feel a lot of affection for [Polanski], he's a man I really like and I know him a bit, our daughters are very good friends but there is one justice, [and] it is the same for everyone".

On September 30, 2009, the French government dropped its public support for Polanski, on the grounds that he was not "above the law". Government spokesman Luc Chatel said, "We have a judicial procedure under way, for a serious affair, the rape of a minor, on which the American and Swiss legal systems are doing their job", adding: "One can understand the emotion that this belated arrest, more than 30 years after the incident, and the method of the arrest, have caused."

Public opinion polls in France consistently show that between 65% and 75% of the population want to see Polanski extradited to the United States.

==== Poland ====
Poland's political leader Jarosław Kaczyński responded to early reactions by urging members of his party to exercise calm and reminding them that it is a "case of rape and of punishment for having sex with a child".

==== Switzerland ====
In Switzerland, the arrest caused widely varying reactions in the media and in politics, while the Swiss minister of justice, Eveline Widmer-Schlumpf, defended the arrest as legally required under the Swiss–US extradition treaty and as a matter of equality before the law.

==== United States ====
When asked if he would consider granting Polanski a pardon, then-California governor Arnold Schwarzenegger said: "I think that he is a very respected person and I am a big admirer of his work. But, nevertheless, I think he should be treated like everyone else. It doesn't matter if you are a big-time movie actor or a big-time movie director or producer." Schwarzenegger added: "And one should look into all of the allegations, not only his allegations, but the allegations about his case. Was there something done wrong? You know, was injustice done in the case?"

More than 100 people in the film industry, including Woody Allen, Monica Bellucci, Martin Scorsese, Darren Aronofsky, David Lynch, Wes Anderson, Harrison Ford, Harmony Korine, Michael Mann, and Jonathan Demme, among many others signed a petition in 2009 calling for Polanski's release. A subsequent petition the following year was signed by Jean-Luc Godard, Mathieu Amalric, Xavier Beauvois, Agnès Varda, Bertrand Tavernier, Jean-Stéphane Bron, Patricio Guzmán, Jean-Paul Civeyrac, Katell Quillévéré and Cristi Puiu; Olivier Assayas and Louis Garrel also signed both petitions. Emma Thompson originally signed the first petition but later asked for her name to be removed after a meeting with 19-year-old college student and activist Caitlin Hayward-Tapp. Other celebrities like Meryl Streep, Whoopi Goldberg, and Debra Winger did not sign either petition but spoke out in support of Polanski in other ways. Harvey Weinstein also defended Polanski, arguing: "Hollywood has the best moral compass, because it has compassion." Johnny Depp believed there were "shady dealings" behind his arrest. Pierce Brosnan said that he was, "very disappointed and saddened by his arrest". One celebrity who publicly refused to sign the petition was Michael Douglas. In 2018, Natalie Portman, Xavier Dolan and Asia Argento all expressed regret and apologized for signing the original petition. After David Lynch's death in January 2025, his daughter wrote the following August on TikTok that her dad came to regret signing the petition.

Whereas a number of those in Hollywood rallied behind Polanski, the Los Angeles Times reported that most others in the United States seemed to have a different perspective: "In letters to the editor, comments on Internet blogs and remarks on talk radio and cable news channels, the national sentiment is running overwhelmingly against Polanski." Following the rearrest, David Wells announced that he had lied in the Wanted and Desired documentary, claiming that director Marina Zenovich told him that the documentary would not air in America if he refused to lie in it (which Zenovich denied). Wells then criticized Polanski, calling him a rapist and pedophile. Wells said, "It's outrageous. This pedophile raped a 13-year-old girl. It's still an outrageous offense. It's a good thing he was arrested. I wish it would have happened years before."

In May 2018, Polanski and Bill Cosby were expelled from the Academy of Motion Picture Arts and Sciences. The Academy stated, "The board continues to encourage ethical standards that require members to uphold the academy's values of respect for human dignity." Polanski's legal team responded to the dismissal by threatening a lawsuit stating that the academy had violated its code of conduct. The Academy responded to Polanski's lawyers by stating, "The Board of Governors retains its independent duty and authority as outlined in the bylaws to address and take action on any matter, whether submitted by the process outlined above or not, related to a member's status and to enforce the Academy's Standards of Conduct." Polanski's wife Emmanuelle Seigner turned down an invitation to join the academy in support.

=== Attempted extradition ===
On September 30, 2009, The New York Times reported that Reid Weingarten of the firm Steptoe & Johnson, a well-known criminal defense lawyer, had been hired by Polanski for his defense along with attorneys Douglas Dalton, Bart Dalton, and Chad Hummel. According to the New York Times:

Mr. Weingarten is expected to mount a legal effort to block Mr. Polanski's extradition before the issue works its way through the Swiss legal system, according to people who were briefed on Mr. Weingarten's involvement, but spoke on condition of anonymity because they were not authorized to speak publicly. A critical step will most likely be a move to stop the extradition before United States authorities send the required documents to Switzerland. Mr. Polanski's team may do so by arguing either that his crime does not qualify for extradition, because he was originally to have been sentenced to less than a year in prison, or that he has already effectively served his sentence, during a 42-day psychiatric evaluation.

On October 21, after Swiss authorities had rejected Polanski's initial pleas to be released on bail pending the result of any extradition hearing, one of his lawyers, Georges Kiejman, floated the idea of a possible voluntary return to the United States in an interview with the radio station Europe 1: "If this process drags on, it is not completely impossible that Roman Polanski could choose to go finally to explain himself in the United States where the arguments in his favor exist."

On November 25, the Federal Criminal Court of Switzerland accepted Roman Polanski's plea to be freed on US$4.5M bail. The court said Polanski could stay at his chalet in the Swiss Alps and that he would be monitored by an electronic tag during his house arrest.

On December 10, Division 7 of the California Court of Appeal of the Second Appellate District heard oral argument on Polanski's petition for writ of mandate. Television stations including CNN, France 2 and TVN24 also filed applications to cover the hearing.

The Court denied Polanski's petition in an opinion filed on December 24. The Court reasoned that since Polanski had adequate legal remedies in 1977 and at present in 2009, there was no reason to carve out a special exception to the fugitive disentitlement doctrine. In arriving at that holding, the Court pointed out that neither side had realized that Polanski had the option of simply asking to be sentenced in absentia, which would result in a hearing where Polanski could directly attack the trial judge's alleged malfeasance in 1977. On January 6, 2010, upon remand to the superior court, Polanski's lawyers followed the appellate court's advice and presented a notarized letter from Polanski in which he asked to be sentenced in absentia. The court asked the parties to brief the issue and scheduled a hearing for January 25. At the hearing, Superior Court Judge Peter Espinoza ruled Polanski must be present in court for sentencing.

On July 12, 2010, the Swiss authorities announced that they would not extradite Polanski to the US in part due to a fault in the American request for extradition. Polanski was no longer subject to house arrest, or any monitoring by Swiss authorities. In a press conference held by Swiss justice minister Eveline Widmer-Schlumpf, she stated that Polanski's extradition to the US was rejected, in part, because US officials failed to produce certain documents, specifically "confidential testimony from a January 2010 hearing on Mr. Polanski's original sentencing agreement". According to Swiss officials, the records were required to determine if Polanski's 42-day court-ordered psychiatric evaluation at Chino State Prison constituted Polanski's whole sentence according to the now-deceased Judge Rittenband. They reasoned that if this was the correct understanding, then "Roman Polanski would actually have already served his sentence and therefore both the proceedings on which the US extradition request is founded and the request itself would have no foundation."

== Subsequent legal actions ==
Geimer sued Polanski in 1988, alleging sexual assault, intentional infliction of emotional distress and seduction. The case was settled out of court in 1993. After Polanski missed an October 1995 payment deadline, Geimer filed papers with the court, attempting to collect at least US$500,000. The court held that Polanski still owed her over $600,000, but it was unclear as of 2009 if this had since been paid.

In a 2003 interview, Geimer said, "Straight up, what he did to me was wrong. But I wish he would return to America so the whole ordeal can be put to rest for both of us. I'm sure if he could go back, he wouldn't do it again. He made a terrible mistake but he's paid for it." In 2008, Geimer stated in an interview that she wishes Polanski would be forgiven; "I think he's sorry, I think he knows it was wrong. I don't think he's a danger to society. I don't think he needs to be locked up forever and no one has ever come out ever – besides me – and accused him of anything. It was 30 years ago now. It's an unpleasant memory ... (but) I can live with it."

In 2008, a documentary film of the aftermath of the incident, Roman Polanski: Wanted and Desired, premiered at the Sundance Film Festival. Following review of the film, Polanski's attorney, Douglas Dalton, contacted the Los Angeles district attorney's office about prosecutor David Wells' conversation with the trial judge, Laurence J. Rittenband. Based on statements by Wells included in the film, Polanski and Dalton sought judicial review of whether Wells acted illegally and engaged in malfeasance by interfering with the operation of the trial. However, after Polanski's arrest, Wells recanted his statements in the film, admitting that he had lied and "tried to butter up the story to make me look better".

In December 2008, Polanski's lawyer filed a request to Judge David S. Wesley to have the case dismissed on the grounds of judicial and prosecutorial misconduct. The filing claims that Judge Rittenband (deceased in 1993) violated the plea bargain by keeping in communication about the case with deputy district attorney David Wells, who was not involved. In January 2009, Polanski's lawyer filed a further request to have the case dismissed, and to have the case moved out of Los Angeles, as the Los Angeles courts require him to appear before the court for any sentencing or dismissal, and Polanski did not intend to appear. In February 2009, Polanski's request was tentatively denied by Judge Peter Espinoza, who said that he would make a ruling if Polanski appeared in court. The same month, Samantha Geimer filed to have the charges against Polanski dismissed from court, saying that decades of publicity as well as the prosecutor's focus on lurid details continues to traumatize her and her family. Judge Espinoza also stated that he believed there was misconduct by the judge in the original case but Polanski must return to the United States to apply for dismissal.

There is no statute of limitations governing the case because Polanski had already been charged and pleaded guilty in 1978 to having had unlawful sex with a minor. While some legal experts interviewed in 2009 thought he might at that point face no jail time for unlawful sex with a minor, his failure to appear at sentencing is in itself a crime.

On July 7, 2009, Polanski's attorneys filed a petition for a writ of mandate (the California equivalent of a writ of mandamus) with the Second Appellate District of the California Court of Appeal in order to seek review of Judge Espinoza's decision on an expedited basis. The next day, the Court ordered the prosecution to file an opposition, thus indicating that it was assuming jurisdiction over the case. This was unusual; petitions for extraordinary writs are usually summarily denied without any explanation.

In late October 2014, Polanski was questioned by prosecutors in Kraków, and released. Back in 2010 the Polish prosecutor general stated that under Polish law too much time had passed since the crime for Polanski to be extradited. On February 25, 2015, Polanski appeared in a Polish court for a hearing on the US request for extradition. The judge scheduled another hearing to be held in April or sooner, to give time to review documents that arrived from Switzerland.

On October 30, 2015, Polish judge Dariusz Mazur denied a request by the United States to extradite Polanski. According to the judge, allowing Polanski to be returned to American law enforcement would be an "obviously unlawful" act, depriving the filmmaker of his freedom and civil liberty. His lawyers argued that extradition would violate the European Convention on Human Rights. Polanski holds dual citizenship with Poland and France.

On November 27, 2015, Poland decided it will not extradite Polanski to the US after prosecutors declined to challenge the court's ruling, agreeing that Polanski had served his punishment and did not need to face a US court again. Preparations for a movie he was working on had been stalled by the extradition request from the previous year.

On December 6, 2016, the Supreme Court of Poland ruled to reject an appeal filed by Polish minister of justice Ziobro, and to uphold the October 2015 ruling.

On August 17, 2017, Los Angeles County Superior Court Judge Scott Gordon rejected a request from Samantha Geimer to dismiss the case against Polanski.

In December 2017, Polanski filed a ₪1.5 million suit in Herzliya Magistrates' Court against Israeli journalist and filmmaker Matan Uziel. Polanski maintained that Uziel, through his website, www.imetpolanski.com, falsely reported that five women had come forward to accuse him of raping them. Polanski was suing for libel and defamation of character. Herzliya Magistrates' Court rejected Polanski's request to be exempt from appearing in court after filing the libel suit. While Polanski gave various reasons for his inability to appear, the presiding judge, Gilad Hess, dismissed these one-by-one and ordered Polanski to pay Uziel ₪10,000 in costs. In November 2018, it was published that Polanski decided to drop the lawsuit, and was ordered by the court to pay Uziel ₪30,000 (US$8,000) for court costs. The court accepted Uziel's request that the suit not be dropped, but rather that it be rejected, making Polanski unable to sue Uziel again over the same issue in the future.

In November 2022, Polanski filed a cybersquatting dispute with World Intellectual Property Organization against the domain name imetpolanski.com. Polanski asked World Intellectual Property Organization to rule that the site was cybersquatting. However, the three-person panel ruled that Polanski did not show the domain was registered and used in bad faith, nor did he show that the registrant, Matan Uziel, lacked rights or legitimate interests in the domain name.

In June 2023, Polanski was sued in the Los Angeles Superior Court by a woman who alleged that he raped her at his home in 1973 after supplying her with tequila shots. The woman was said to be under the age of 18 at the time of the alleged incident. Polanski, who was set to face a civil trial for this allegation, had his trial date set for August 2025. The lawsuit was settled and dismissed in October 2024.

== Legacy ==
In 2013, Samantha Geimer published her view on the rape in her autobiography The Girl: A Life in the Shadow of Roman Polanski. In March 2023, Geimer and her husband met with Polanski and his wife Seigner for a French magazine cover interview. Geimer states in the interview: "Let me be very clear: what happened with Polanski was never a big problem for me. I didn't even know it was illegal, that someone could be arrested for it. I was fine, I'm still fine. It was so unfair and so in opposition to justice ... Everyone should know by now that Roman has served his sentence. Which was ... long if you want my opinion. Anyone who thinks that he deserves to be in prison is wrong. It isn't the case today and it wasn't the case yesterday."

The exposure of Harvey Weinstein as a predator brought renewed attention to Polanski's rape of a minor. Polanski has blamed Harvey Weinstein for the renewed focus on his sexual abuse case in the 2000s and claimed that Weinstein tried to brand him a "child rapist" to prevent him from winning an Oscar in 2003.

== See also ==
- Charlotte Lewis § Accusation against Roman Polanski
