= Robin Williams: Come Inside My Mind =

- Film poster
- Directed by: Marina Zenovich
- Produced by: Alex Gibney; Shirel Kozak; Nancy Abraham
- Starring: Robin Williams; Whoopi Goldberg; David Letterman; Billy Crystal
- Cinematography: Nick Higgins; Jenna Rosher; Thorsten Thielow; Wolfgang Held
- Edited by: Greg Finton; Poppy Das
- Music by: Adam Dorn
- Production company: HBO Documentary Films
- Distributed by: Jigsaw Productions
- Release dates: January 2018 (Sundance); July 16, 2018 (HBO)
- Running time: 117 minutes
- Country: United States
- Language: English

Robin Williams: Come Inside My Mind is a 2018 American documentary film directed by Marina Zenovich, celebrating the life and career of comedian Robin Williams, who died in 2014. An HBO production, it features interviews with Whoopi Goldberg, David Letterman, Billy Crystal, among others. It also includes outtakes and little known clips from Williams' stand-up routines.

The film played six sell-out screenings at the Sundance Film Festival in 2018. It was also screened at the Nantucket Film Festival and had a first HBO broadcast on July 16, 2018. That same summer, the documentary was shown at the Hamptons International Film Festival SummerDocs. A discussion with Zenovich and Q&A host Alec Baldwin followed the Hamptons screening. (Trailer)

== Interviews ==
- Mark Rasmussen (friend)
- Stan Wilson (friend)
- Valerie Velardi (ex-wife)
- David Letterman
- Bennett Tramer (writer)
- McLaurin Smith-Williams (half-brother)
- Frankie Williams (sister-in-law)
- Elayne Boosler
- Scott Marshall
- Pam Dawber
- Howard Storm
- Eric Idle
- Stu Smiley (manager)
- Arthur Grace
- David Steinberg
- Billy Crystal
- Zak Williams (son)
- Steve Martin
- Whoopi Goldberg
- Mark Romanek
- Cheri Minns (hair & makeup artist)
- Lewis Black

== Reception ==
On the review aggregator Rotten Tomatoes, the film holds an approval rating of 94%, based on 51 reviews, with an average rating of 7.4/10. The website's critical consensus reads, "Robin Williams: Come Inside My Mind offers a poignant -- albeit tantalizingly incomplete -- peek behind the curtain of a brilliant performer's tragically curtailed life and career." On Metacritic, the film has a weighted average score of 78 out of 100, based on 19 critics, indicating "generally favorable reviews".

Variety described the film as being "sharp-edged, humane, and deeply researched enough to take you closer to the manic engine of Williams' brilliance and pain".
