= George N. Zenovich =

American politician (1922–2013)

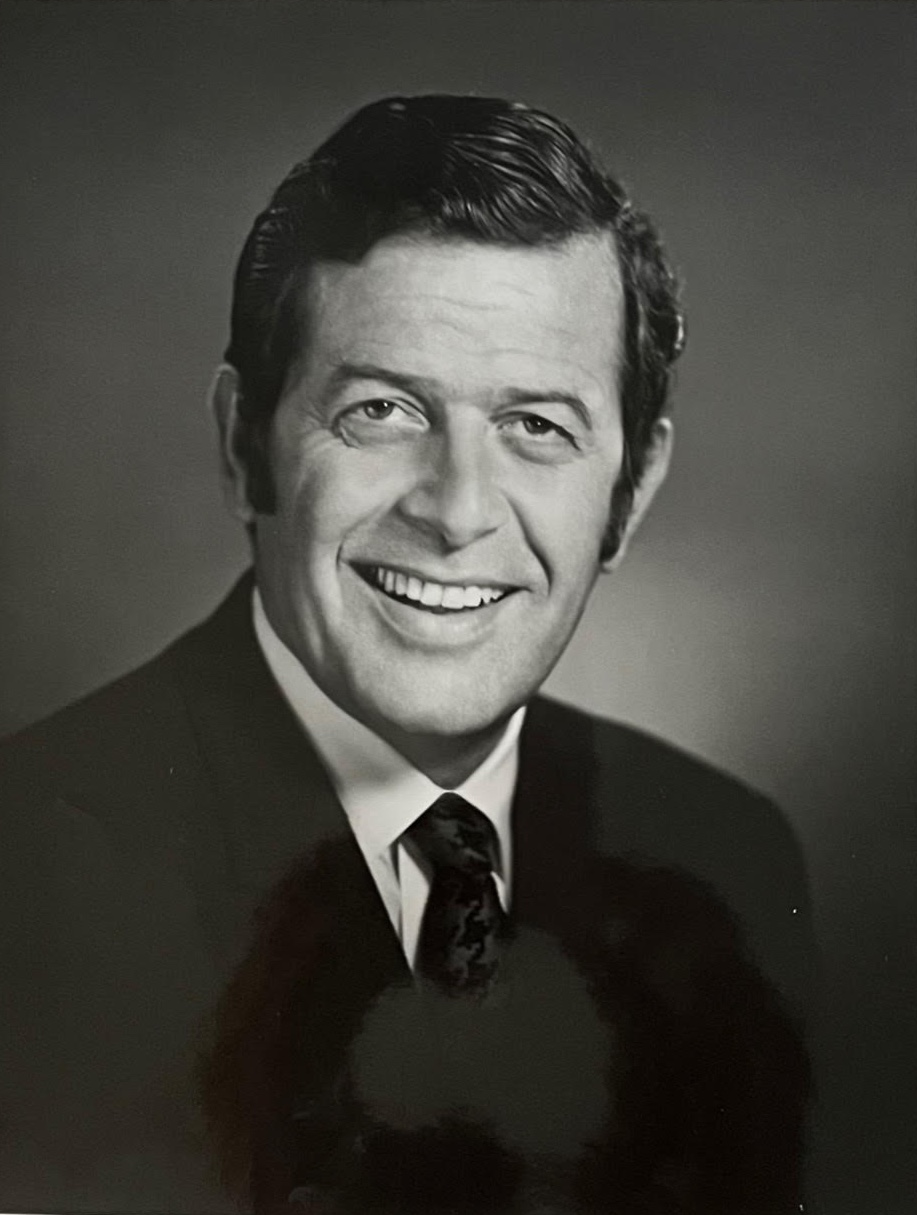
- Official portrait, 1973

Member of the California Senate from the 14th district
- In office December 2, 1974 – March 22, 1979
- Preceded by: Clark L. Bradley
- Succeeded by: Kenneth L. Maddy

Member of the California Senate from the 16th district
- In office January 4, 1971 – November 30, 1974
- Preceded by: Hugh M. Burns
- Succeeded by: Walter W. Stiern

Majority Leader of the California Assembly
- In office 1966–1968
- Preceded by: Jerome Waldie
- Succeeded by: W. Craig Biddle

Member of the California State Assembly from the 32nd district
- In office January 7, 1963 – January 4, 1971
- Preceded by: Bert Delotto
- Succeeded by: Kenneth L. Maddy

Personal details
- Born: April 29, 1922 Fresno, California, U.S.
- Died: September 25, 2013 (aged 91) Fresno, California, U.S.
- Party: Democratic
- Spouse: Vera Sarenac
- Children: 2, including Marina Zenovich
- Relatives: P. G. Morgan (son-in-law)
- Education: Fresno State; Southwestern Law School
- Occupation: California Senator and Appellate Justice

Military service
- Branch/service: United States Army
- Battles/wars: World War II

George Nicholas Zenovich (April 29, 1922 – September 25, 2013) was an American politician and jurist from California who served in the California State Assembly and the California State Senate. Following his terms in the state legislature, Zenovich served as Justice of the Fifth District in the California Courts of Appeal.

== Early life and education ==
Zenovich was born in Fresno, California, to parents Nicholas and Eva, who were Serb immigrants to the United States from Yugoslavia.

He was elected student body president in high school and at California State University, Fresno, where he graduated with a Political Science degree. He earned his law degree from Southwestern Law School.

In 1972, Zenovich served as an Adjunct Professor of Political Science at California State University, Fresno. He holds a Certificate of Attendance from the International Academy of Law, The Hague, Holland (1954), an LL.E from Southwestern College of Law, Los Angeles, California (1952), and a B.A. from Fresno State College (1948).

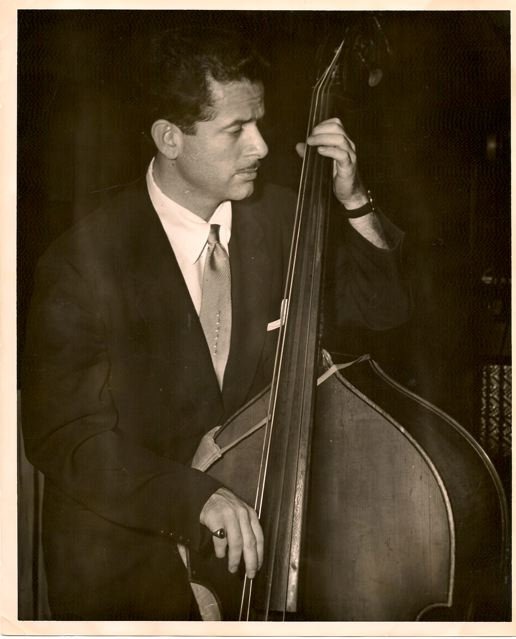
George N. Zenovich playing the standup bass, circa 1952.

Zenovich was involved in the music community and played several instruments throughout his lifetime. "He played the violin first, then the viola and string bass," John Ellis explains in Zenovich's obituary.

Richard Lehman, a former congressman and state legislator, "recalled that Zenovich talked like a musician when he met him in 1969. Lehman was attending the University of California, Santa Cruz, and Mr. Zenovich called to offer him a job in his Assembly office. Lehman asked what he'd do, and got a groovy answer: 'Whatever you want to do, baby.'"

== Military Service ==
During World War II, Zenovich was enlisted for three years as an Army Air Force Japanese Code Interceptor Operator. He served with honor and distinction during World War II in the United States Air Force in New Guinea and the Philippines.

He played the stand-up bass in "General Kenney's 13th Air Force Band," playing at Nadzab, New Guinea, and Clark Field in the Philippines. Zenovich continued to play the stand-up bass throughout his career.

== Early career ==
In 1947, he was admitted to the California Bar and began working as an attorney in 1953. He had a private law practice in Fresno, California from 1953 to 1979, where he worked as a sole practitioner.

"Zenovich has been a practicing attorney in Fresno since he was admitted to the Bar, except for approximately two years in 1954 and 1955 which he spent in Europe. While in Europe he attended the International Academy of Law at the Hague, Holland, toured Western Europe and spent considerable time in Yugoslavia. He married just prior to leaving Yugoslavia. His wife, Vera, had just completed law school at the University of Sarajevo," explains a political booklet about the California Legislature that was published by the California Teamsters Legislative Counsel (of the International Brotherhood of Teamsters).

Zenovich played the standup bass and was a lifetime member of the Fresno Musicians Local 210, since 1940, and the Los Angeles Musicians Local 47, since 1949.

He was elected to the Fresno County Democratic Central Committee in 1956 and formed the first Fresno county Democratic Committee for John F. Kennedy in 1960.

== California State Assembly (1963-1970) ==
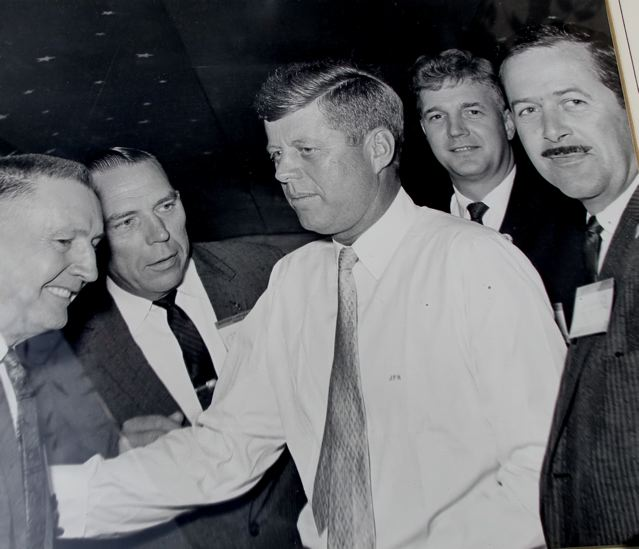
John F. Kennedy and George N. Zenovich in 1960.

Elected as Assemblyman for the 32nd District, Zenovich served in the California State Assembly from 1963 to 1970, where he acted as Majority Floor Leader and Chairman of the Democratic Caucus.

By 1964, Mr. Zenovich was considered a "disciple" of legendary Assembly Speaker Jesse Unruh, and in mid-1966 Unruh appointed him majority floor leader.

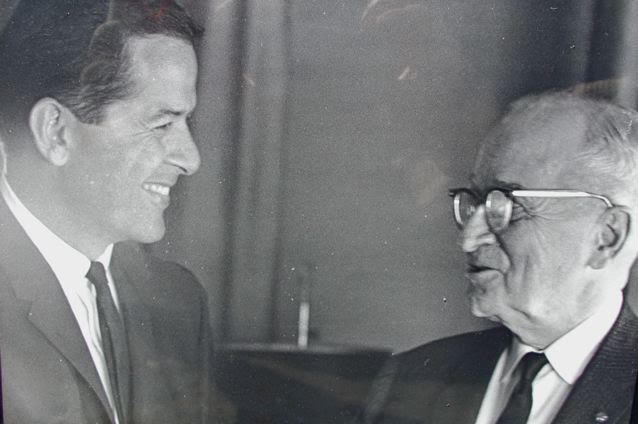
George N. Zenovich (left) and President Harry S. Truman (right) in 1962.

Zenovich was known as a strong advocate for farming communities in the San Joaquin Valley.

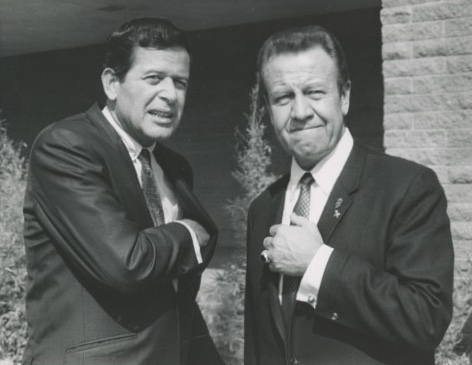
George N Zenovich (left) and Jesse M. Unruh (right) - circa 1960s.

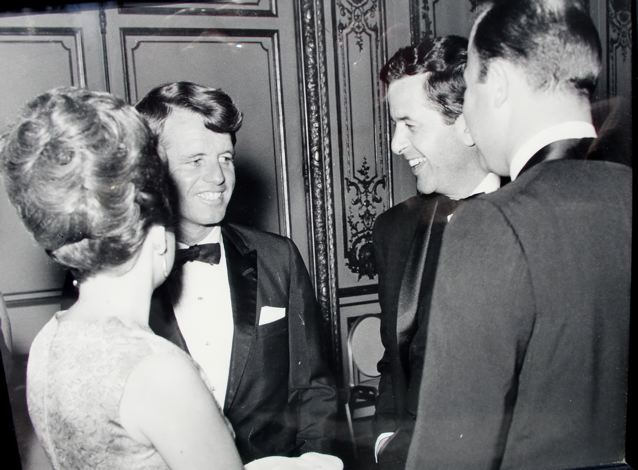
Bobby Kennedy (left) and George N. Zenovich (right) in Los Angeles, May 1968.

An Assembly bill carried by Assemblyman Zenovich requiring electronic locator beacons on small aircraft became the model for federal legislation that has saved countless lives, and his extensive legislation in the area of the developmentally disabled, including the creation of a Diagnostic School for the Neurologically Handicapped, located in Fresno.

He ran the John F. Kennedy campaign in California's Central Valley and President County, and was also a member of the California Bobby Kennedy delegation to the 1968 Democratic Convention in Chicago.

Zenovich was successfully reelected 3 times before he ran and was elected to the California Senate in 1970.

== California Senate (1970-1979) ==
Representing the 16th District, Zenovich then served in the California State Senate from 1970 to 1979, where he was responsible for carrying the legislation for the California Housing Finance Agency, which provided low-interest housing loans for low income families.

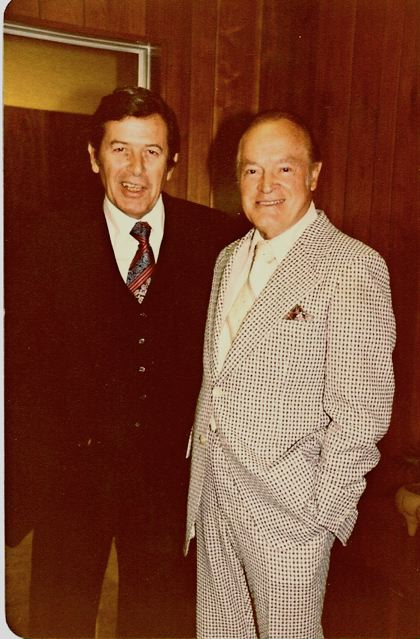
George N. Zenovich (left) and Bob Hope (right) in Sacramento, 1977.

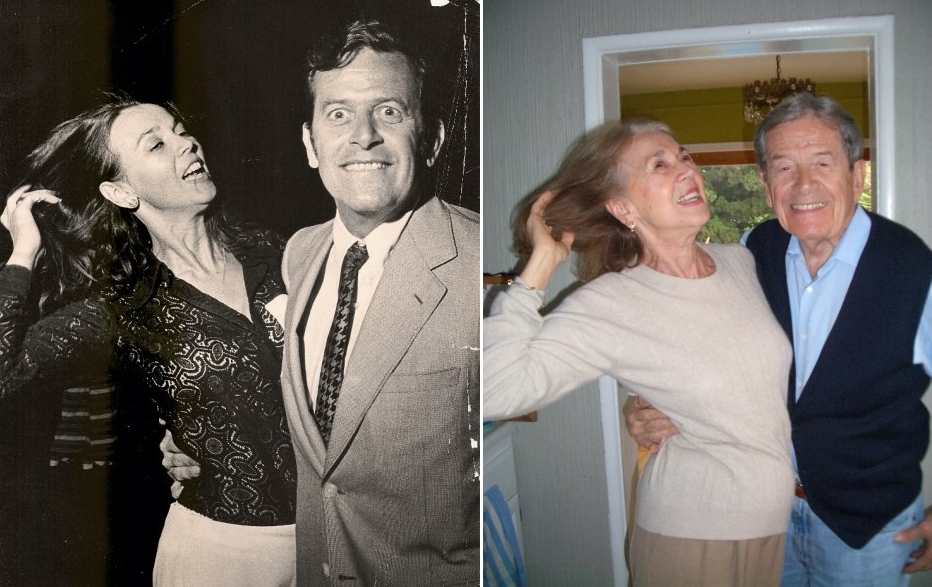
George N. Zenovich and wife Vera "Kika" Zenovich, @circa 1978 (left) and 2010 (right).

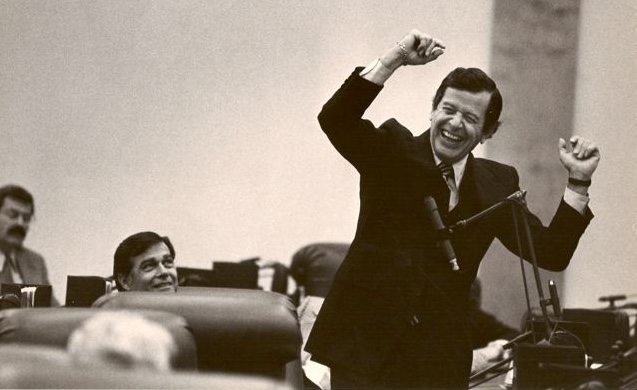
George N. Zenovich saying goodbye on the Senate floor in 1979.

Zenovich also carried the 1975 legislation that created the California Arts Council, the Dixon-Zenovich-Maddy California Arts Act of 1975, which promoted the arts, supported artists, and fostered cultural development across California.

"In its first budget year (January to June 1976), the CAC awarded $594,000 in grants in four program areas: Arts in Social Institutions, Community Arts, Alternatives in Education, State of the Arts Documentation, and Special Projects. The number of programs has fluctuated over the decades, but at their core, grant funding supports California’s arts and culture in the key areas of access, equity, and inclusion; community vibrancy; and arts learning and engagement."

“The California Arts Council might not exist if not for George Zenovich,” explained Craig Watson, who was the Director of the California Arts Council in 2013. “His passion for music and care for all Californians placed the establishment of the California Arts Council among his many significant accomplishments as a lawmaker and activist. He will be missed.”

The California Arts Council (CAC) just celebrated its 50th anniversary, in 2026.

Zenovich was also instrumental in passing the Agricultural Labor Relations Act (ALRA) of 1975, which was the first of its kind in the nation, creating the first Agricultural Labor Relations Board.

According to the Agricultural Labor Relations Board website, ALRA was "a landmark California law that extended collective bargaining rights and protections to agricultural employees who are excluded from the coverage of the federal National Labor Relations Act. The ALRA authorizes the ALRB to oversee and protect the rights of agricultural employees to organize themselves in negotiating the terms and conditions of their employment, including whether or not to have labor unions represent them."

"George's legislative interests are in the fields of municipal and county government, finance and insurance, water, judiciary, natural resources, planning and public works, and he has indicated an interest in social welfare," a booklet about his life by the Teamsters Union explains.

As vice chairman of the Senate Judiciary Committee, he was involved in major legislation, leading him to want a career on the bench.

== Justice of the Fifth District Courts of Appeal (1979-1984) ==
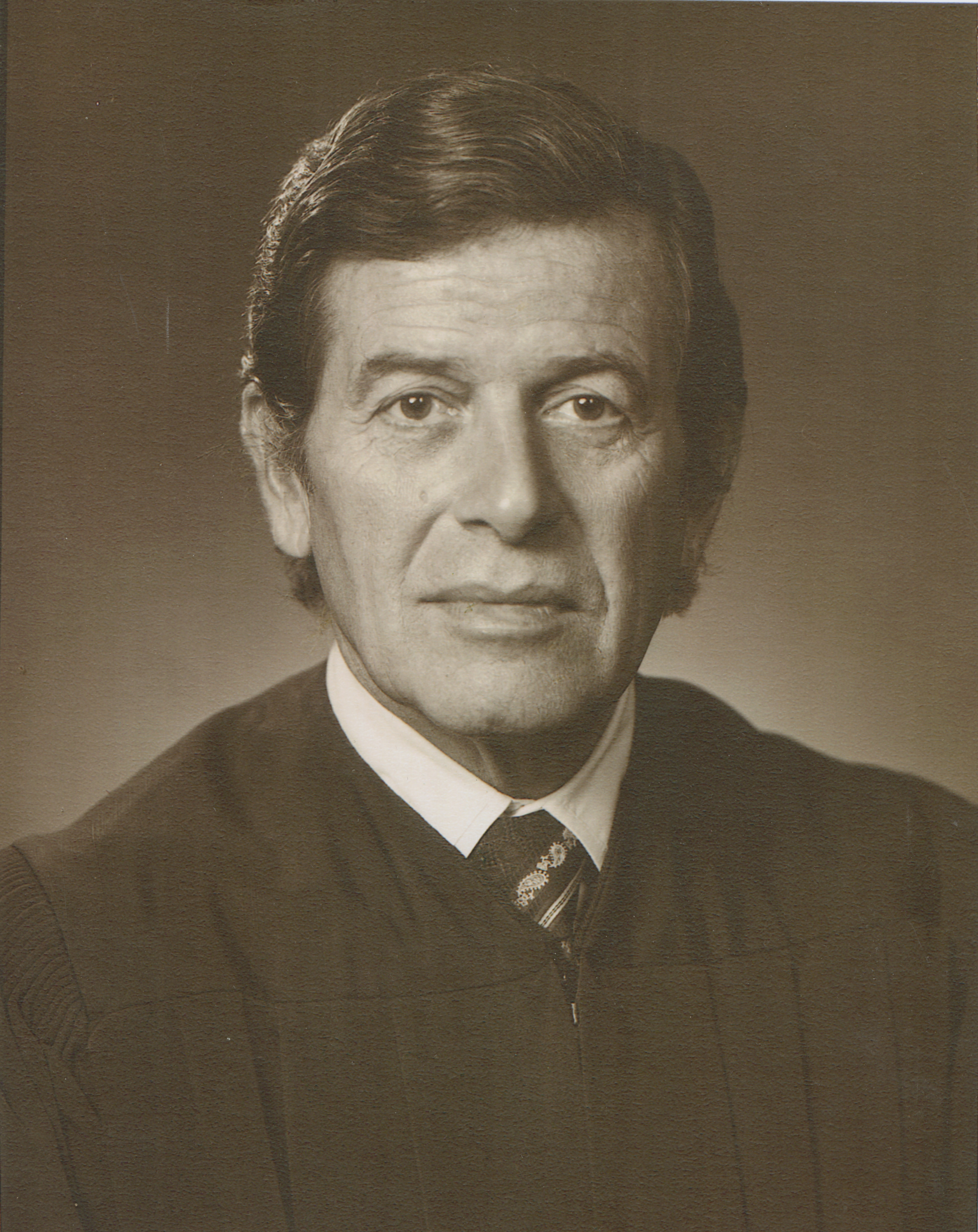
George N. Zenovich - Justice of the Fifth District Courts of Appeal (1979-1984)

From 1979-1984, Zenovich served as Justice of the Fifth District in the California Courts of Appeal. He was appointed by then Governor Jerry Brown.

Rosendo Peña, who worked as a staff attorney for Mr. Zenovich and is now himself a Justice for the Fifth District California Courts of Appeal, explained Zenovich's unique style; "He was very easygoing as far as the way he interacted with folks, but he had a certain sense of what justice was."

The Fifth District Court of Appeal Courthouse in Fresno is named after him. After leaving the bench, Zenovich became a lobbyist in Sacramento.

== Personal life ==
Zenovich was married to Vera "Kika" Sarenac, who was born in the former Yugoslavia, now Croatia.

George met Vera while on an extended European trip visiting relatives in Yugoslavia. They married in 1955 in Belgrade. They had two daughters. Ninon Zenovich (aka Ninon Aprea) is an actress and Marina Zenovich is a documentary film director.

Zenovich passed away in September 2013 in Fresno, California at the age of 91. His daughter, Marina, created an 8-minute video tribute to her father that began the luncheon program at his memorial.

Governor Jerry Brown, a longtime friend and political ally, attended Zenovich's memorial. "George was a longtime friend and a rare public servant who combined wisdom, skill and basic practicality," Brown said in a statement. "His many friends will miss him." Zenovich's stated philosophy was that he was "a progressive Democrat with respect to fiscal and economic affairs of government, and a liberal Democrat with respect to Civil Liberties."

Zenovich's papers were donated to the Special Collections research center of the Henry Madden Library at California State University, Fresno.

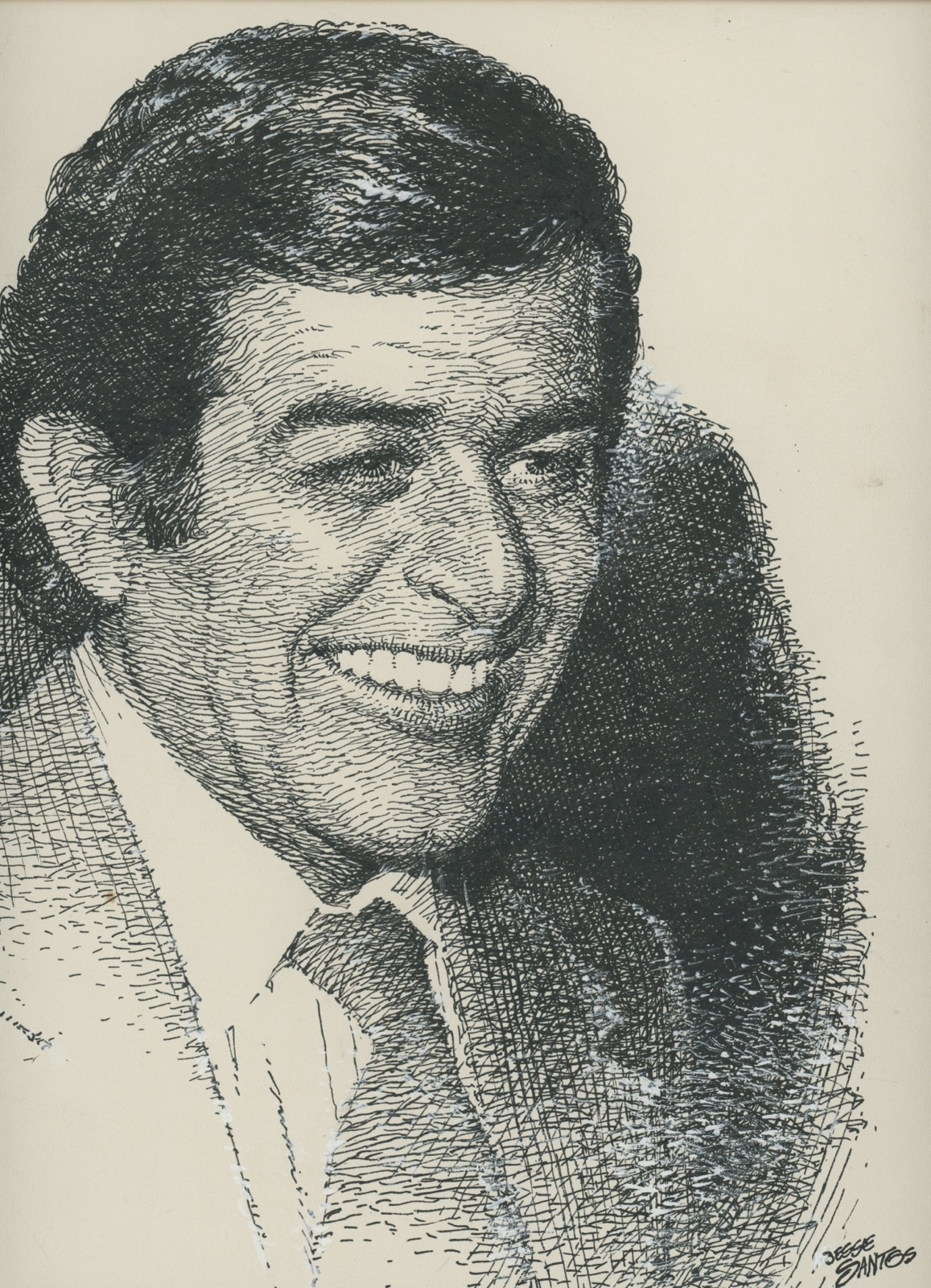
George N. Zenovich by Jesse Santos, circa 1980s.
