= Lance (film) =

2020 documentary about Lance Armstrong

- Directed by: Marina Zenovich
- Starring: Lance Armstrong
- Cinematography: Nick Higgins
- Edited by: Allan Duso
- Music by: H. Scott Salinas
- Release date: 2020
- Country: United States
- Language: English

Lance is a 2020 documentary directed by Marina Zenovich, a two-part film totaling four hours about the life and career of the renowned cyclist Lance Armstrong.

The documentary premiered at the Sundance Film Festival in January 2020 and aired in two parts on ESPN in May 2020. (Trailer)

== Plot ==
The documentary features extensive interviews with Lance Armstrong. In these interviews, he reflects on his life and career, offering his perspective on different periods. Zenovich also includes interviews with a wide range of individuals connected to Armstrong's story. This includes former teammates like Tyler Hamilton and George Hincapie, rivals, friends, and journalists who covered his career, such as David Walsh and Betsy Andreu. It presents his journey to recognition, his struggle with testicular cancer, his achievement of seven consecutive Tour de France victories, and his decline due to his proven use of performance enhancing drugs, which ultimately stripped him of those titles and left his legacy as one of the most dramatic falls from grace in sports history.
