= Laurence J. Rittenband =

American judge (1905–1993)

Laurence James Rittenband (December 5, 1905 – December 30, 1993) was an American judge. He was a judge on the Superior Court of Los Angeles County in California.

== Background ==
The son of a New York City clothing manufacturer, he graduated at the age of 19 from the New York University School of Law, after having entered directly from high school. After graduating with his law degree from NYU, he found he was too young to take the bar exam. While waiting, he earned a degree from Harvard University, graduating summa cum laude.

After passing the bar, he worked in the U.S. Attorney's office in New York and taught law at City College of New York. He also had a private law practice. He was wounded in North Africa during World War II while serving with United States Army Air Forces intelligence.

He was appointed to the Los Angeles Municipal Court in 1961 by then-Governor Edmund G. (Pat) Brown, Sr. He was appointed to the Superior Court the following year. Brown and Rittenband had different politics; Brown was a Democrat, and Rittenband was a Republican.

== Notable cases ==
His legal career spanned 60 years, during which he presided over several much publicized cases, including Elvis Presley's divorce, Marlon Brando's child-custody battle, a paternity suit against Cary Grant, the Billionaire Boys Club murder trial of Joe Hunt, and the criminal proceedings against Roman Polanski.

A Los Angeles Times story about Rittenband, entitled "Laurence J. Rittenband, 81, Shows an Unorthodox Style: Crusty Judge Rules His Court With Iron Hand," described the controversy around the judge's conduct during the Hunt case. The story said Hunt's defense team had a host of complaints against Rittenband, who put a gag order on one of Hunt's defense attorneys after they publicly criticized his actions. In response, lawyers Arthur Barens and Richard Chier moved for a mistrial on the basis of judicial misconduct.

Rittenband once vowed to remain on the bench until Polanski was behind bars, but retired in 1989, when he was 83 years old. Rittenband issued an arrest warrant for Polanski after he fled in 1978; Polanski was arrested in September 2009 in Switzerland, while traveling to attend a film festival there, but was later released and allowed to return to France.

The 2008 documentary Roman Polanski: Wanted and Desired attacks Judge Rittenband for both his private life and his handling of the Polanski case. He was removed from the case in February 1978 after a complaint was filed by Polanski's attorney and supported by the prosecutor in the case, as attested by both in individual interviews in the documentary.

Shortly after Polanski fled, Rittenband denied he ever did anything that the 2008 documentary would go on to allege, by issuing the following statement:

I then stated that an appropriate sentence would be for Mr. Polanski to serve out the remainder of the 90-day period for which he had been sent to Chino, provided Mr. Polanski were to be deported by the Immigration and Naturalization Bureau, by stipulation or otherwise, at the end of the 90 days. I expressly stated that I was aware that the court lacked authority to order Mr. Polanski deported directly or as a condition of probation. However, based on the facts before me, I believed that the safety and welfare of the citizens of California required that Mr. Polanski be kept out of circulation for more than 90 days. However, since Mr. Polanski is an alien who had pleaded guilty to an act of moral turpitude, I believe that the interests of the citizens of California could be adequately safeguarded by a shorter jail term if Mr. Polanski would thereafter absent himself from the country.

== Death ==
Rittenband died aged 88 of cancer in West Los Angeles.
