= Roman Polanski: Wanted and Desired =

- Promotional poster
- Directed by: Marina Zenovich
- Written by: Marina Zenovich; Joe Bini; P. G. Morgan
- Produced by: Jeff Levy-Hinte; Lila Yacoub; Marina Zenovich; P. G. Morgan; Michelle Sullivan
- Starring: Samantha Geimer; Roman Polanski; David Wells; Sharon Tate
- Cinematography: Tanja Koop
- Edited by: Joe Bini
- Music by: Mark Degli Antoni
- Distributed by: THINKFilm; HBO Documentary Films (United States and Canada); The Weinstein Company (International)
- Release dates: 18 January 2008 (Sundance); 20 May 2008 (United States)
- Running time: 99 minutes
- Countries: United States; United Kingdom
- Languages: English; French
- Box office: $100,500

Roman Polanski: Wanted and Desired is a 2008 documentary film directed by Marina Zenovich. It concerns film director Roman Polanski and his sexual abuse case.

== Premise ==
It examines the events that led to Polanski fleeing the United States after being embroiled in a controversial trial, and his unstable reunion with his adopted country. A follow-up to the film, also directed by Zenovich, titled Roman Polanski: Odd Man Out was released on 26 March 2013, detailing Polanski's successful legal battle to avoid extradition to the US, a battle that took place after Roman Polanski: Wanted and Desired came out.

== Reception ==
=== Critical response ===
Metacritic rates Roman Polanski: Wanted and Desired a score of 78/100 based on 16 reviews ("generally favorable"). Rotten Tomatoes scores the film at 85% positive reviews based on 48 reviews, with the website's critics consensus calling it "a courtroom drama and an exploration of celebrity and responsibility."

Cathleen McGuigan, reviewing the film for Newsweek, referred to the film as "deft and subtle" and particularly noted "an enigmatic little scene near the end [where] [y]ou see a fierce old whale of a man in a chair, banging a drum while an elfin youth jumps and hops to the beats, like a puppet on a string. The hopping boy finally escapes his tormentor by scurrying and tumbling across a field, running toward the Eiffel Tower in the distance. The tyrannized, barefoot kid is Polanski himself, and the footage is from a 16-minute short called The Fat and the Lean that he made in 1961, on the brink of his fame as a brilliant new European director. The wordless scene may last less than a minute in Marina Zenovich's documentary, but it sticks with you, and it echoes another clip in her film. This one is from a television interview Polanski did decades later where he says he felt like 'a mouse with which an abominable cat was making sport.' The cat in question was Los Angeles Judge Laurence J. Rittenband, who'd presided over the director's 1977 criminal case for having sex with a 13-year-old girl".

One negative review by Bill Wyman, writing for Salon, stated: "The film, which has inexplicably gotten all sorts of praise, whitewashes what Polanski did in blatant and subtle fashion[.] The tone is set early on, when a friend of Polanski's tells of being woken up and informed that the director had to call his attorney. The moment is actually played for laughs, with interspersed shots of a worried Mia Farrow using the phone in a scene from Rosemary's Baby — that, too, about a horrifically abused woman. But the scene isn't used to illustrate the victim's story -- it's about poor Roman. He's the person making the desperate phone call. It's an odd juxtaposition when you think about it."

Nathan Southern of Allmovie writes that, "filmmaker Marina Zenovich revisits this difficult case via extensive interviews with Geimer [the underage victim], defense attorney Douglas Dalton, Assistant DA Roger Gunson, and others. In the process, she raises pivotal questions about the U.S. legal system and the fairness of the judge, Laurence J. Rittenband (who was reportedly extremely vocal about his desire to topple Polanski) and encounters many recollections of judicial malfeasance from those who were involved".

=== Retraction by David Wells ===
After the arrest of Roman Polanski in Switzerland in 2009, David Wells, now a retired deputy district attorney, recanted the interview he gave the director about advising the judge in the case in ex parte communication. According to Marcia Clarke of The Daily Beast:

"'I lied', Wells told me yesterday, referring to his comments in the movie that he told the judge how he could renege on a plea-bargain agreement and send Polanski back to jail after he had been released from a 42-day psychiatric evaluation—the heart of Polanski's claims of prosecutorial and judicial misconduct. 'I know I shouldn't have done it, but I did. The director of the documentary told me it would never air in the States. I thought it made a better story if I said I'd told the judge what to do".

Zenovich responded, as reported by Peter Knegt at IndieWire:

"I am perplexed by the timing of David Wells’ statement to the press that he lied in his interview with me for the documentary 'Roman Polanski: Wanted and Desired', she said. 'Since June of 2008, the film has been quite visible on U.S. television via HBO, in theaters and on DVD, so it is odd that David Wells has not brought this issue to my attention before.

Zenovich said that the day she filmed Mr. Wells at the Malibu Courthouse, he gave her a one-hour interview. 'He signed a release like all my other interviewees, giving me permission to use his interview in the documentary worldwide, she said. "At no time did I tell him that the film would not air in the United States.

She went on to say she is 'astonished' that Wells has changed his story. 'Mr. Wells was always friendly and open with me', she said. 'At no point in the four years since our interview has he ever raised any issues about its content. In fact, in a July 2008 story in The New York Times, Mr. Wells corroborated the account of events that he gave in my film… It is a sad day for documentary filmmakers when something like this happens".

Michael Ceply commented on the affair in the New York Times:

"The incident points to the power and the limitations of the documentary art.[...] Pat Aufderheide, director of the Center for Social Media at American University [...] pointed out that the documentarians' tendency to focus on 'untold stories' has occasionally reopened a legal case or righted a perceived wrong.[...]"

"But even an on-camera account like that of Mr. Wells, which provoked a legal challenge that is still before the appellate courts in California, has its vulnerabilities. Ms. Zenovich acknowledged on Thursday, for instance, that she had no second person describing the contacts between Mr. Wells, who was assigned to the courthouse but had no official role in the Polanski case, and Judge Rittenband, who has since died. 'There wasn't a witness to the conversations with Rittenband', she said".

"Since Mr. Polanski's arrest, Ms. Zenovich said, a strong public reaction against his misdeeds in the original case seem to have overridden concerns about any misdeeds in the courts. Originally charged with seven counts, including rape and sodomy, he pleaded guilty to having sex with a minor and then fled the country before his sentencing".

"People don’t seem to connect to what this is, really, because of the crime, and the schism it has caused with finding normalcy and sanity' she said of her continuing examination of the Los Angeles legal system, with its problems with celebrity justice".

"Even if Dave Wells were to be lying' in the original film, she said, 'we still have a judge who was instructing the prosecutor and defense lawyer on how to behave, and doing it based on how he would look in the media,' she added, referring to other allegations in the documentary".

=== Accolades ===
Roman Polanski: Wanted and Desired was nominated for five Primetime Emmy Awards and won two: "Outstanding Directing For Nonfiction Programming" and "Outstanding Writing for Nonfiction Programming". The National Board of Review of Motion Pictures awarded it the title of one of the top 5 documentaries of 2008. It won the "Editing Award Documentary" at the Sundance Film Festival It was also listed as one of ten films in the "Hall of Shame" of the 2008 Women Film Critics Circle Awards.

== See also ==
- The Girl: A Life in the Shadow of Roman Polanski a book by Samantha Geimer
