= P. G. Morgan =

Welsh writer and film producer

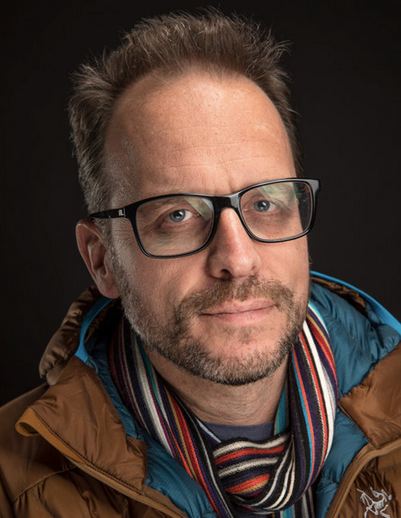
- P. G. Morgan in 2017
- Born: Bangor, Wales
- Occupation: Producer
- Spouse: Marina Zenovich
- Children: 1
- Relatives: George N. Zenovich (father-in-law)

Peter Gwynne Morgan is a Welsh television and film writer/producer. A winner of the 2009 Emmy Award for Outstanding Writing for Nonfiction Programming for his work on Roman Polanski: Wanted and Desired, he is married to American documentary director Marina Zenovich.

== Education ==
Morgan was born in Bangor, North Wales. He was educated at Henleaze School, Bristol and Penglais School, Aberystwyth. After school, Morgan won a scholarship to read Modern History at Worcester College, Oxford. While at Oxford, Morgan was a regular contributor to "Isis" and also produced plays at the Oxford Playhouse and the Edinburgh Fringe Festival. After graduating in 1988 with an Honours degree in Modern History, Morgan obtained a postgraduate Diploma in Journalism from the University of Wales, College of Cardiff.

== Career ==
=== TV journalism ===
After a short stint on the Western Mail, Morgan joined ITN as a graduate trainee in 1989. He worked as a producer for News at Ten and as a foreign affairs producer and on-screen reporter for Channel 4 News, covering stories such as the LA Riots, the Eritrean Civil War and the Troubles in Northern Ireland.

During his time at Channel Four News, Morgan spent three years covering the conflict in the Former Yugoslavia, working closely with the late Gaby Rado. Morgan was also part of the reporting team which won 1994 BAFTA and Amnesty International Awards for their coverage of the siege of Srebrenica. During these years, Morgan also wrote regularly for The Guardian, the Times Literary Supplement, the New Statesman, Index on Censorship and the New Welsh Review. In 1999, he returned to Oxford as a Reuters Fellow at Green Templeton College.

=== Writing ===
Between 2000 and 2005, Morgan worked simultaneously for ITN and for BBC Current Affairs, writing TV scripts and producing several drama documentaries. His teen drama Spit Game was nominated for a BAFTA in 2004. He also wrote episodes of Doctors and The Bill and over a dozen radio dramas, for which he received the Richard Imison Award (for A Matter of Interpretation) and a Sony Radio Academy Award nomination (for "Milosevic in Black and White").

In 2002, Morgan published Fire Mountain: a non-fiction account of the 1902 volcanic eruption of Mont Pelée in Martinique. The book was published by Bloomsbury in the UK and the US and was subsequently adapted for Secrets of the Dead; a drama documentary series produced by National Geographic. Around this time, Morgan also undertook archival research for Professor Kathy Burk's biography of the historian A.J.P. Taylor.

=== US work ===
In 2005, Morgan moved to the United States. While in the US he wrote and produced several documentaries: Roman Polanski: Wanted and Desired (winner of the 2009 Emmy for Best Writing in Non-Fiction Programming), Richard Pryor: Omit the Logic, Revenge of the Electric Car and Fantastic Lies.

Morgan has also worked as a series producer on two CNN series: The Eighties and The History of Comedy and was a story consultant on the Beatles documentary Eight Days a Week. He was an Executive Producer on Flint Town, a Netflix documentary series about the police department of Flint, Michigan. In 2019, he continued his connection with Netflix by being one of the executive producers on Diagnosis, a seven-part Netflix documentary series produced in association with Scott Rudin, the New York Times and Lightbox. In 2020, Morgan was one of the producers on LANCE, a two-part feature documentary about the disgraced cyclist Lance Armstrong. The film premiered at the 2020 Sundance Film Festival and then debuted on ESPN in May 2020.

Morgan has written several feature film scripts and a TV pilot for Anonymous Content. His feature script Dear Norman Mailer was performed at the Hay Festival in 2015 by Tatiana Maslany and Tom Cullen. Other recent executive producer credits include What Happens in Hollywood, The Way Down: God, Greed and the Cult of Gwen Shamblin and Desperately Seeking Soulmate: Escaping Twin Flames Universe.

Morgan is a member of the Writers Guild of America (West) and an Associate Fellow of the Royal Historical Society. He is also a member of the Seren Network, a Welsh government initiative that helps students in Wales to achieve their full academic potential.

== Personal life ==
Morgan is married to the American documentary director Marina Zenovich daughter of former California State Senator George N. Zenovich. They have one son.

== Awards and nominations ==
Year	Awards and nominations
1989	Vogue Young Writers Award – Special Commendation
1995	BAFTA for Best International News Reporting (Channel 4 News Team)
1995	Amnesty International Award for International News (Channel 4 News Team)
1999	Richard Imison New Writers Award
2004	Sony Radio Academy Award, Drama Nomination
2004	BAFTA for Children's Drama, Nomination (Spit Game)
2008	Writers Guild Award (Writing Team, The Bill)
2009	Emmy for Best Writing, Non-Fiction Programming (Roman Polanski: Wanted and Desired)
2013	NAACP Best Documentary (Omit the Logic)
2016	SXSW Gamechanger Award Nominee – Fantastic Lies
2016	Critics Choice Award – Best Documentary Feature (TV/Streaming) & Best Sports Documentary – Fantastic Lies
2018	Critic's Choice Documentary Awards Nomination: Best Political Documentary, Best Limited Doc Series — Flint Town
2018	IDA Awards Nomination: Best Limited Series — Flint Town
