= Split Screen (TV series) =

- Created by: John Pierson; Janet Pierson
- Country of origin: United States
- No. of seasons: 4
- No. of episodes: 66

Production
- Executive producers: Dean Silvers; Marlen Hecht
- Running time: 22 minutes
- Production company: Grainy Pictures

Original release
- Network: IFC
- Release: March 10, 1997 – April 2, 2001

Split Screen is an American television series that originally aired from March 10, 1997 to April 2, 2001 on IFC.

== Summary ==
The series focused on independent filmmaking in America and was hosted by John Pierson.

Split Screen featured segments from many notable filmmakers, actors, and actresses including: Kevin Smith, Spike Lee, Matt Damon, Edward Norton, Buck Henry, Wes Anderson, Steve Buscemi, Harmony Korine, John Waters, Atom Egoyan, John Turturro, Christopher Walken, Richard Linklater, Errol Morris, Miranda July, and William H. Macy.

== Legacy ==
The Blair Witch Project first received notoriety as a segment on Split Screen.

All episodes are available to stream on the Criterion Channel as of 2026.

== See also ==
- Indiewood
- Cult film
- Cinephilia
