= Spike, Mike, Slackers, & Dykes =

Book by John Pierson

Spike, Mike, Slackers, & Dykes: A Guided Tour Across a Decade of American Independent Cinema
- Author: John Pierson
- Language: English
- Publication date: 1996
- Publication place: United States
- Media type: Print
- Pages: 371

Spike, Mike, Slackers, & Dykes: A Guided Tour Across a Decade of American Independent Cinema (1996) is a non-fiction book about independent cinema by John Pierson. The title references Pierson's interactions with Spike Lee, Michael Moore, Richard Linklater of the film Slacker and the lesbian-oriented film Go Fish.
