= John Pierson (filmmaker) =

American independent filmmaker (born 1954)

- Born: April 10, 1954 (age 71); United States
- Occupation(s): Filmmaker, film producer, writer

John Pierson (born April 10, 1954) is an American independent filmmaker. He is best known for helping to produce the first works by filmmakers Spike Lee, Richard Linklater, Michael Moore, Rose Troche, Guinevere Turner, and Kevin Smith, which he wrote about in his 1995 book Spike, Mike, Slackers, & Dykes (reissued in 2004 as Spike, Mike Reloaded).

== Career ==
After the publication of Spike, Mike, Slackers, & Dykes, Pierson began producing and hosting the TV show Split Screen, which premiered on IFC in 1997 and had an initial run of 60 episodes containing interviews and video essays covering topics related to American indie film. Season 10 premiered on January 13, 2018, on the Criterion Channel on FilmStruck. Pierson is founder and president of Grainy Pictures, Inc., a film and television production company.

== Personal life ==
Pierson lives in Austin, Texas, and teaches in the University of Texas Radio-Television-Film department. His wife, Janet Pierson, is the chief programmer of the film section of South by Southwest.

== Books ==
- Spike, Mike, Slackers, & Dykes: A Guided Tour Across a Decade of American Independent Cinema. New York: Miramax Books/Hyperion, 1995. ISBN 978-0-7868-6189-7
- Spike, Mike Reloaded: A Guided Tour Across a Decade of American Independent Cinema. New York: Miramax Books/Hyperion, 2003. ISBN 978-1-4013-5950-8
