= List of accolades received by Tár =

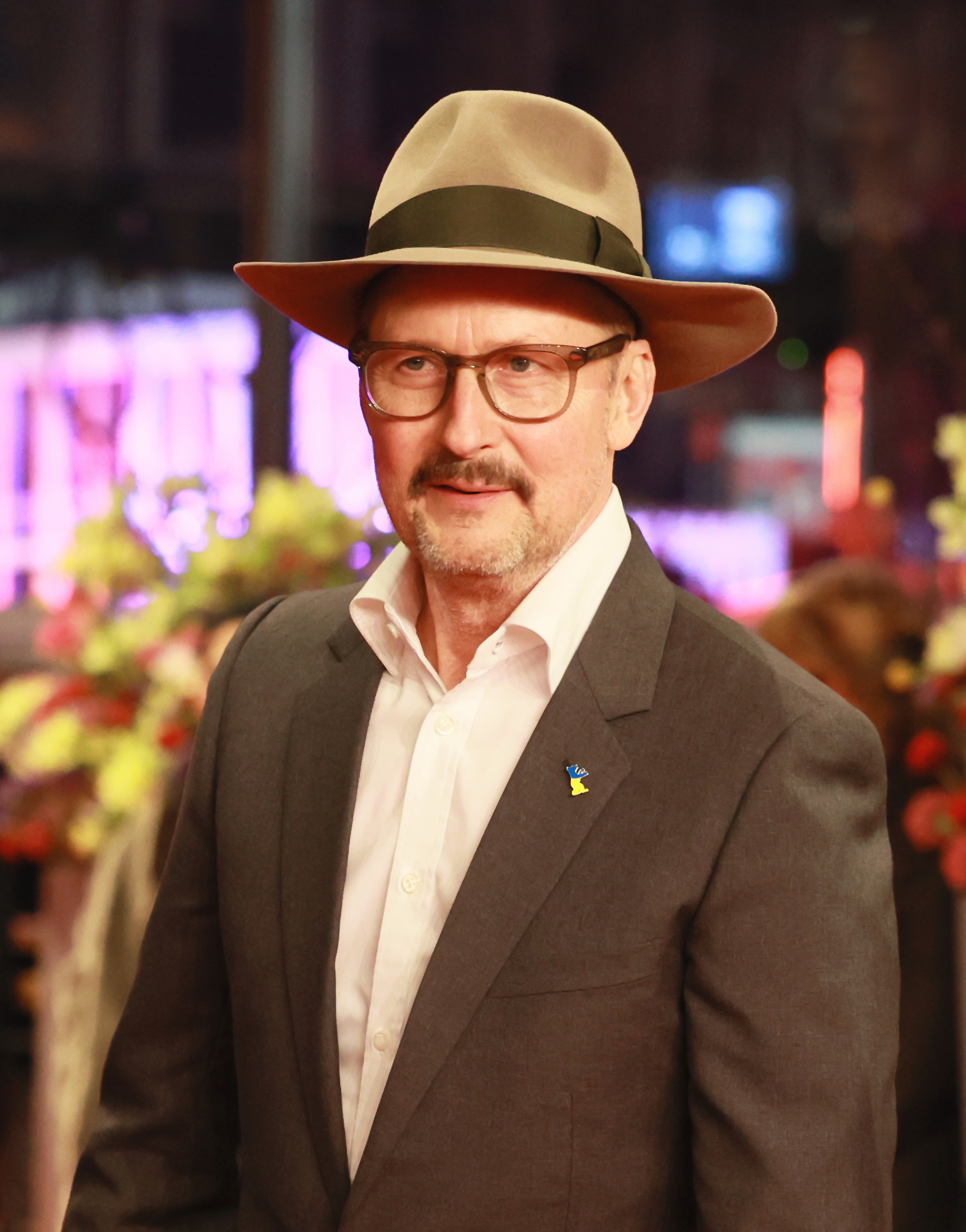
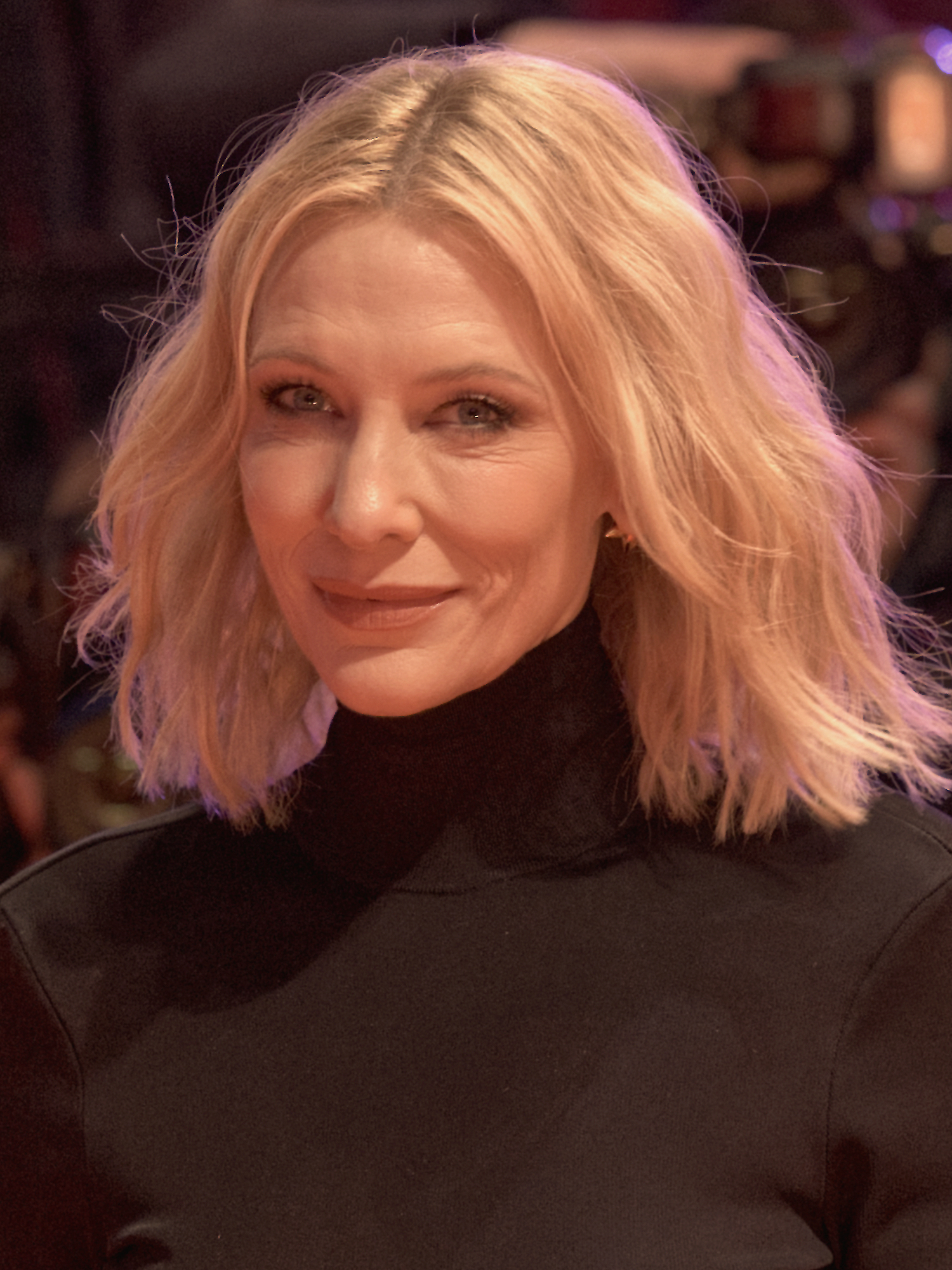
- Todd Field (left) received widespread critical acclaim for his screenplay and direction, as did Cate Blanchett (right) for her performance as Lydia Tár.
Accolades
Award	Wins	Nominations
AACTA International Awards	1	2
AARP Movies for Grownups Awards	0	4
Academy Awards	0	6
ACE Eddie Awards	0	1
Alliance of Women Film Journalists	0	5
American Film Institute Awards	1	1
Artios Awards	0	1
Art Directors Guild Awards	0	1
Austin Film Critics Association	0	4
Boston Society of Film Critics	1	1
British Academy Film Awards	1	5
British Society of Cinematographers	0	1
Camerimage	1	1
Chicago Film Critics Association	1	5
Costume Designers Guild Awards	0	1
Critics' Choice Awards	2	7
Dallas–Fort Worth Film Critics Association	1	3
Directors Guild of America Awards	0	1
Dorian Awards	1	7
Florida Film Critics Circle	2	5
Georgia Film Critics Association	0	4
GLAAD Media Awards	0	1
Golden Globe Awards	1	3
Golden Reel Awards	0	1
Golden Trailer Awards	2	5
Gotham Awards	1	5
Hollywood Critics Association	0	5
Hollywood Music in Media Awards	1	1
Hollywood Professional Association	0	2
Houston Film Critics Society	1	4
Independent Spirit Awards	1	7
Indiana Film Journalists Association	3	6
International Cinephile Society	2	6
Iowa Film Critics Association	2	2
Irish Film & Television Awards	1	2
Japan Academy Film Prize	0	1
Kansas City Film Critics Circle	0	1
Las Vegas Film Critics Society	0	2
London Film Critics' Circle	3	6
Los Angeles Film Critics Association	5	5
Mill Valley Film Festival	1	1
National Society of Film Critics	4	4
New York Film Critics Circle	2	2
Online Film Critics Society	2	7
Palm Springs International Film Festival	1	1
Producers Guild of America Awards	0	1
San Diego Film Critics Society	3	7
San Francisco Bay Area Film Critics Circle	0	7
Santa Barbara International Film Festival	1	1
Satellite Awards	0	4
Screen Actors Guild Awards	0	1
Seattle Film Critics Society	2	6
Set Decorators Society of America Awards	1	1
St. Louis Film Critics Association	0	4
Toronto Film Critics Association	2	2
Vancouver Film Critics Circle	0	4
Venice Film Festival	1	3
Washington D.C. Area Film Critics Association	1	6
Women Film Critics Circle	0	1
Writers Guild of America Awards	0	1

Totals (Note: Certain award groups do not simply award one winner. They acknowledge several different recipients, have runners-up, and have third place. Since this is a specific recognition and is different from losing an award, runner-up mentions are considered wins in this award tally. For simplification and to avoid errors, each award in this list has been presumed to have had a prior nomination.)
- Wins: 63
- Nominations: 194

Tár is a 2022 psychological drama film written and directed by Todd Field, and starring Cate Blanchett. The film charts the downfall of fictional composer/conductor Lydia Tár. The supporting cast includes Nina Hoss, Noémie Merlant, Sophie Kauer, Julian Glover, Allan Corduner, and Mark Strong. Tár premiered at the 79th Venice International Film Festival on September 1, 2022, where Blanchett won the Volpi Cup for Best Actress. The film had a limited theatrical release in the United States on October 7, 2022, before a wide release on October 28 by Focus Features.

Tár is the fourth film in history to be named Best of the Year by the New York Film Critics Circle, the Los Angeles Film Critics Association, the London Film Critics' Circle as well as the National Society of Film Critics. More critics named Tár "Best Film of the Year" than any other film released in 2022, including The Atlantic, Entertainment Weekly, The Guardian, The Hollywood Reporter, Screen Daily, Vanity Fair, and Variety; plus, IndieWire's annual poll of 165 critics worldwide.

At the 80th Golden Globe Awards, Blanchett won Best Actress in a Motion Picture – Drama, while the film was nominated for Best Motion Picture – Drama and Best Screenplay. At the 28th Critics' Choice Awards, Blanchett won Best Actress and Hildur Guðnadóttir won Best Score. At the 76th British Academy Film Awards, the film received five nominations, with Blanchett winning for Best Actress in a Leading Role.

At the 95th Academy Awards, Tár received six nominations, including Best Picture, Best Director and Best Original Screenplay for Field, and Best Actress for Blanchett.

== Accolades ==
Accolades received by Tár
Award	Date	Category	Recipient(s)	Result	Ref.
AACTA International Awards	February 24, 2023	Best Actress	Cate Blanchett	Won	
AACTA International Awards	February 24, 2023	Best Screenplay	Todd Field	Nominated	
AARP Movies for Grownups Awards	January 28, 2023	Best Movie for Grownups	Tár	Nominated	
AARP Movies for Grownups Awards	January 28, 2023	Best Director	Todd Field	Nominated	
AARP Movies for Grownups Awards	January 28, 2023	Best Actress	Cate Blanchett	Nominated	
AARP Movies for Grownups Awards	January 28, 2023	Best Screenwriter	Todd Field	Nominated	
Academy Awards	March 12, 2023	Best Picture	Todd Field, Alexandra Milchan, and Scott Lambert	Nominated	
Academy Awards	March 12, 2023	Best Director	Todd Field	Nominated	
Academy Awards	March 12, 2023	Best Actress	Cate Blanchett	Nominated	
Academy Awards	March 12, 2023	Best Original Screenplay	Todd Field	Nominated	
Academy Awards	March 12, 2023	Best Cinematography	Florian Hoffmeister	Nominated	
Academy Awards	March 12, 2023	Best Film Editing	Monika Willi	Nominated	
ACE Eddie Awards	March 5, 2023	Best Edited Feature Film (Drama)	Monika Willi	Nominated	
Alliance of Women Film Journalists	January 5, 2023	Best Film	Tár	Nominated	
Alliance of Women Film Journalists	January 5, 2023	Best Actress	Cate Blanchett	Nominated	
Alliance of Women Film Journalists	January 5, 2023	Most Daring Performance	Cate Blanchett	Nominated	
Alliance of Women Film Journalists	January 5, 2023	Best Screenplay, Original	Todd Field	Nominated	
Alliance of Women Film Journalists	January 5, 2023	Best Editing	Monika Willi	Nominated	
American Film Institute Awards	December 9, 2022	Top 10 Films of the Year	Tár	Won (Note: This award does not have a single winner, but recognizes multiple films.)	
Artios Awards	March 9, 2023	Big Budget – Drama	Avy Kaufman, Simone Bär (location casting), and Jeremy Zimmerman (location casting)	Nominated	
Art Directors Guild Awards	February 18, 2023	Excellence in Production Design for a Contemporary Film	Marco Bittner Rosser	Nominated	
Austin Film Critics Association	January 10, 2023	Best Director	Todd Field	Nominated	
Austin Film Critics Association	January 10, 2023	Best Actress	Cate Blanchett	Nominated	
Austin Film Critics Association	January 10, 2023	Best Original Screenplay	Todd Field	Nominated	
Austin Film Critics Association	January 10, 2023	Best Film Editing	Monika Willi	Nominated	
Boston Society of Film Critics	December 11, 2022	Best Director	Todd Field	Won	
British Academy Film Awards	February 19, 2023	Best Film	Todd Field, Scott Lambert, and Alexandra Milchan	Nominated	
British Academy Film Awards	February 19, 2023	Best Director	Todd Field	Nominated	
British Academy Film Awards	February 19, 2023	Best Actress in a Leading Role	Cate Blanchett	Won	
British Academy Film Awards	February 19, 2023	Best Original Screenplay	Todd Field	Nominated	
British Academy Film Awards	February 19, 2023	Best Sound	Deb Adair, Stephen Griffiths, Andy Shelley, Steve Single, and Roland Winke	Nominated	
British Society of Cinematographers	February 11, 2023	Cinematography in a Feature Film	Florian Hoffmeister	Nominated	
Chicago Film Critics Association	December 14, 2022	Best Film	Tár	Nominated	
Chicago Film Critics Association	December 14, 2022	Best Director	Todd Field	Nominated	
Chicago Film Critics Association	December 14, 2022	Best Actress	Cate Blanchett	Won	
Chicago Film Critics Association	December 14, 2022	Best Original Screenplay	Todd Field	Nominated	
Chicago Film Critics Association	December 14, 2022	Best Best Editing	Monika Willi	Nominated	
Costume Designers Guild Awards	February 27, 2023	Excellence in Contemporary Film	Bina Daigeler	Nominated	
Critics' Choice Awards	January 15, 2023	Best Picture	Tár	Nominated	
Critics' Choice Awards	January 15, 2023	Best Director	Todd Field	Nominated	
Critics' Choice Awards	January 15, 2023	Best Actress	Cate Blanchett	Won	
Critics' Choice Awards	January 15, 2023	Best Original Screenplay	Todd Field	Nominated	
Critics' Choice Awards	January 15, 2023	Best Cinematography	Florian Hoffmeister	Nominated	
Critics' Choice Awards	January 15, 2023	Best Editing	Monika Willi	Nominated	
Critics' Choice Awards	January 15, 2023	Best Score	Hildur Guðnadóttir	Won	
Dallas–Fort Worth Film Critics Association	December 19, 2022	Best Picture	Tár	4th place	
Dallas–Fort Worth Film Critics Association	December 19, 2022	Best Director	Todd Field	3rd place	
Dallas–Fort Worth Film Critics Association	December 19, 2022	Best Actress	Cate Blanchett	Won	
Directors Guild of America Awards	February 18, 2023	Outstanding Directing – Feature Film	Todd Field	Nominated	
Dorian Awards	February 23, 2023	Film of the Year	Tár	Nominated	
Dorian Awards	February 23, 2023	LGBTQ Film of the Year	Tár	Nominated	
Dorian Awards	February 23, 2023	Director of the Year	Todd Field	Nominated	
Dorian Awards	February 23, 2023	Film Performance of the Year	Cate Blanchett	Nominated	
Dorian Awards	February 23, 2023	Supporting Film Performance of the Year	Nina Hoss	Nominated	
Dorian Awards	February 23, 2023	Screenplay of the Year	Todd Field	Nominated	
Dorian Awards	February 23, 2023	Film Music of the Year	Hildur Guðnadóttir	Won	
Florida Film Critics Circle	December 22, 2022	Best Picture	Tár	Nominated	
Florida Film Critics Circle	December 22, 2022	Best Director	Todd Field	Nominated	
Florida Film Critics Circle	December 22, 2022	Best Actress	Cate Blanchett	Won	
Florida Film Critics Circle	December 22, 2022	Best Supporting Actress	Nina Hoss	Won (Note: Tied with Jessie Buckley for Women Talking.)	
Florida Film Critics Circle	December 22, 2022	Best Original Screenplay	Todd Field	Nominated	
Georgia Film Critics Association	January 13, 2023	Best Picture	Tár	Nominated	
Georgia Film Critics Association	January 13, 2023	Best Director	Todd Field	Nominated	
Georgia Film Critics Association	January 13, 2023	Best Actress	Cate Blanchett	Nominated	
Georgia Film Critics Association	January 13, 2023	Best Original Screenplay	Todd Field	Nominated	
GLAAD Media Awards	March 30, 2023	Outstanding Film – Wide Release	Tár	Nominated	
Golden Globe Awards	January 10, 2023	Best Motion Picture – Drama	Tár	Nominated	
Golden Globe Awards	January 10, 2023	Best Actress in a Motion Picture – Drama	Cate Blanchett	Won	
Golden Globe Awards	January 10, 2023	Best Screenplay	Todd Field	Nominated	
Golden Reel Awards	February 26, 2023	Outstanding Achievement in Music Editing – Feature Motion Picture	Gerard McCann	Nominated	
Golden Trailer Awards	June 29, 2023	Most Original Trailer	"Time" (Mark Woollen & Associates)	Won	
Golden Trailer Awards	June 29, 2023	The Don LaFontaine Award for Best Voice Over	"Time" (Mark Woollen & Associates)	Nominated	
Golden Trailer Awards	June 29, 2023	Best Romance TV Spot (for a Feature Film)	"Fame Murder" (GrandSon Creative)	Nominated	
Golden Trailer Awards	June 29, 2023	Best Digital – Drama	"Split" (Mark Woollen & Associates)	Nominated	
Golden Trailer Awards	June 29, 2023	Best Teaser Poster	Tár (AV Print)	Won	
Gotham Awards	November 28, 2022	Best Feature	Tár	Nominated	
Gotham Awards	November 28, 2022	Outstanding Lead Performance	Cate Blanchett	Nominated	
Gotham Awards	November 28, 2022	Outstanding Supporting Performance	Nina Hoss	Nominated	
Gotham Awards	November 28, 2022	Outstanding Supporting Performance	Noémie Merlant	Nominated	
Gotham Awards	November 28, 2022	Best Screenplay	Todd Field	Won	
Hollywood Critics Association Awards	February 24, 2023	Best Picture	Tár	Nominated	
Hollywood Critics Association Awards	February 24, 2023	Best Indie Film	Tár	Nominated	
Hollywood Critics Association Awards	February 24, 2023	Best Director	Todd Field	Nominated	
Hollywood Critics Association Awards	February 24, 2023	Best Actress	Cate Blanchett	Nominated	
Hollywood Critics Association Awards	February 24, 2023	Best Original Screenplay	Todd Field	Nominated	
Hollywood Music in Media Awards	November 16, 2022	Music Themed Film, Biopic, or Musical	Tár	Won	
Hollywood Professional Association	November 28, 2023	Outstanding Color Grading – Live-Action Theatrical Feature	Tim Masick (Company 3)	Nominated	
Hollywood Professional Association	November 28, 2023	Outstanding Editing – Theatrical Feature	Monika Willi	Nominated	
Houston Film Critics Society	February 18, 2023	Best Picture	Tár	Nominated	
Houston Film Critics Society	February 18, 2023	Best Director	Todd Field	Nominated	
Houston Film Critics Society	February 18, 2023	Best Actress	Cate Blanchett	Won	
Houston Film Critics Society	February 18, 2023	Best Screenplay	Todd Field	Nominated	
Independent Spirit Awards	March 4, 2023	Best Feature	Todd Field, Scott Lambert, and Alexandra Milchan	Nominated	
Independent Spirit Awards	March 4, 2023	Best Director	Todd Field	Nominated	
Independent Spirit Awards	March 4, 2023	Best Lead Performance	Cate Blanchett	Nominated	
Independent Spirit Awards	March 4, 2023	Best Supporting Performance	Nina Hoss	Nominated	
Independent Spirit Awards	March 4, 2023	Best Screenplay	Todd Field	Nominated	
Independent Spirit Awards	March 4, 2023	Best Cinematography	Florian Hoffmeister	Won	
Independent Spirit Awards	March 4, 2023	Best Editing	Monika Willi	Nominated	
Indiana Film Journalists Association	December 19, 2022	Best Film	Tár	Nominated	
Indiana Film Journalists Association	December 19, 2022	Best Director	Todd Field	Won	
Indiana Film Journalists Association	December 19, 2022	Best Lead Performance	Cate Blanchett	Won	
Indiana Film Journalists Association	December 19, 2022	Best Original Screenplay	Todd Field	Won	
Indiana Film Journalists Association	December 19, 2022	Best Cinematography	Florian Hoffmeister	Nominated	
Indiana Film Journalists Association	December 19, 2022	Best Editing	Monika Willi	Nominated	
International Cinephile Society	February 12, 2023	Picture	Tár	5th place	
International Cinephile Society	February 12, 2023	Director	Todd Field	Nominated	
International Cinephile Society	February 12, 2023	Actress	Cate Blanchett	Runner-up	
International Cinephile Society	February 12, 2023	Original Screenplay	Todd Field	Nominated	
International Cinephile Society	February 12, 2023	Editing	Monika Willi	Nominated	
International Cinephile Society	February 12, 2023	Sound Design	Deb Adair, Stephen Griffiths, Andy Shelley, Steve Single, and Roland Winke	Nominated	
International Film Festival of the Art of Cinematography Camerimage	November 19, 2022	Main Competition (Golden Frog)	Florian Hoffmeister and Todd Field	Won	
Iowa Film Critics Association	January 12, 2023	Best Film	Tár	Runner-up (Note: Tied with The Banshees of Inisherin.)	
Iowa Film Critics Association	January 12, 2023	Best Actress	Cate Blanchett	Won	
Irish Film & Television Awards	May 7, 2023	Best International Film	Tár	Nominated	
Irish Film & Television Awards	May 7, 2023	Best International Actress	Cate Blanchett	Won	
Japan Academy Film Prize	March 8, 2024	Outstanding Foreign Language Film	Tár	Nominated	
Las Vegas Film Critics Society	December 12, 2022	Best Actress	Cate Blanchett	Nominated	
Las Vegas Film Critics Society	December 12, 2022	Best Original Screenplay	Todd Field	Nominated	
Kansas City Film Critics Circle	January 22, 2023	Best Lead Actress	Cate Blanchett	Runner-up	
London Film Critics' Circle	February 5, 2023	Film of the Year	Tár	Won	
London Film Critics' Circle	February 5, 2023	Director of the Year	Todd Field	Won	
London Film Critics' Circle	February 5, 2023	Actress of the Year	Cate Blanchett	Won	
London Film Critics' Circle	February 5, 2023	Supporting Actress of the Year	Nina Hoss	Nominated	
London Film Critics' Circle	February 5, 2023	Screenwriter of the Year	Todd Field	Nominated	
London Film Critics' Circle	February 5, 2023	Technical Achievement Award	Stephen Griffiths (sound design)	Nominated	
Los Angeles Film Critics Association	December 11, 2022	Best Film	Tár	Won (Note: Tied with Everything Everywhere All at Once.)	
Los Angeles Film Critics Association	December 11, 2022	Best Director	Todd Field	Won	
Los Angeles Film Critics Association	December 11, 2022	Best Lead Performance	Cate Blanchett	Won	
Los Angeles Film Critics Association	December 11, 2022	Best Screenplay	Todd Field	Won	
Los Angeles Film Critics Association	December 11, 2022	Best Editing	Monika Willi	Runner-up	
Mill Valley Film Festival	October 18, 2022	Overall Audience Favorite	Tár	Won	
National Society of Film Critics	January 7, 2023	Best Film	Tár	Won	
National Society of Film Critics	January 7, 2023	Best Actress	Cate Blanchett	Won	
National Society of Film Critics	January 7, 2023	Best Supporting Actress	Nina Hoss	Runner-up	
National Society of Film Critics	January 7, 2023	Best Screenplay	Todd Field	Won	
New York Film Critics Circle	December 2, 2022	Best Film	Tár	Won	
New York Film Critics Circle	December 2, 2022	Best Actress	Cate Blanchett	Won	
Online Film Critics Society	January 23, 2023	Best Picture	Tár	3rd place	
Online Film Critics Society	January 23, 2023	Best Director	Todd Field	Nominated	
Online Film Critics Society	January 23, 2023	Best Actress	Cate Blanchett	Nominated	
Online Film Critics Society	January 23, 2023	Best Original Screenplay	Todd Field	Nominated	
Online Film Critics Society	January 23, 2023	Best Cinematography	Florian Hoffmeister	Nominated	
Online Film Critics Society	January 23, 2023	Best Editing	Monika Willi	Nominated	
Online Film Critics Society	January 23, 2023	Technical Achievement Award	Sound Design	Won	
Palm Springs International Film Festival	January 5, 2023	Desert Palm Achievement Award, Actress	Cate Blanchett	Won	
Producers Guild of America Awards	February 25, 2023	Outstanding Producer of Theatrical Motion Pictures	Todd Field, Alexandra Milchan, and Scott Lambert	Nominated	
San Diego Film Critics Society	January 6, 2023	Best Picture	Tár	Runner-up	
San Diego Film Critics Society	January 6, 2023	Best Director	Todd Field	Nominated	
San Diego Film Critics Society	January 6, 2023	Best Actress	Cate Blanchett	Runner-up	
San Diego Film Critics Society	January 6, 2023	Best Supporting Actress	Nina Hoss	Nominated	
San Diego Film Critics Society	January 6, 2023	Best Original Screenplay	Todd Field	Nominated	
San Diego Film Critics Society	January 6, 2023	Best Sound Design	Tár	Nominated	
San Diego Film Critics Society	January 6, 2023	Best Use of Music	Tár	Runner-up	
San Francisco Bay Area Film Critics Circle	January 9, 2023	Best Picture	Tár	Nominated	
San Francisco Bay Area Film Critics Circle	January 9, 2023	Best Director	Todd Field	Won	
San Francisco Bay Area Film Critics Circle	January 9, 2023	Best Actress	Cate Blanchett	Won	
San Francisco Bay Area Film Critics Circle	January 9, 2023	Best Supporting Actress	Nina Hoss	Nominated	
San Francisco Bay Area Film Critics Circle	January 9, 2023	Best Original Screenplay	Todd Field	Won	
San Francisco Bay Area Film Critics Circle	January 9, 2023	Best Cinematography	Florian Hoffmeister	Won	
San Francisco Bay Area Film Critics Circle	January 9, 2023	Best Film Editing	Monika Willi	Nominated	
Santa Barbara International Film Festival	February 10, 2023	Outstanding Performer of the Year Award	Cate Blanchett	Won	
Satellite Awards	March 3, 2023	Best Motion Picture – Drama	Tár	Nominated	
Satellite Awards	March 3, 2023	Best Actress in a Motion Picture – Drama	Cate Blanchett	Nominated	
Satellite Awards	March 3, 2023	Best Original Screenplay	Todd Field	Nominated	
Satellite Awards	March 3, 2023	Best Film Editing	Monika Willi	Nominated	
Screen Actors Guild Awards	February 26, 2023	Outstanding Performance by a Female Actor in a Leading Role	Cate Blanchett	Nominated	
Seattle Film Critics Society	January 17, 2023	Best Picture	Tár	Nominated	
Seattle Film Critics Society	January 17, 2023	Best Director	Todd Field	Nominated	
Seattle Film Critics Society	January 17, 2023	Best Actress in a Leading Role	Cate Blanchett	Won	
Seattle Film Critics Society	January 17, 2023	Best Screenplay	Todd Field	Nominated	
Seattle Film Critics Society	January 17, 2023	Best Film Editing	Monika Willi	Nominated	
Seattle Film Critics Society	January 17, 2023	Best Villain	Lydia Tár (portrayed by Cate Blanchett)	Won	
Set Decorators Society of America Awards	February 14, 2023	Best Achievement in Decor/Design of a Contemporary Feature Film	Ernestine Hipper and Marco Bittner Rosser	Won (Note: Tied with Jan Pascale and Jeremy Hindle for Top Gun: Maverick.)	
St. Louis Film Critics Association	December 18, 2022	Best Actress	Cate Blanchett	Nominated	
St. Louis Film Critics Association	December 18, 2022	Best Original Screenplay	Todd Field	Nominated	
St. Louis Film Critics Association	December 18, 2022	Best Editing	Monika Willi	Nominated	
St. Louis Film Critics Association	December 18, 2022	Best Scene	"Lydia bullies a Juilliard student"	Nominated	
Toronto Film Critics Association	January 8, 2023	Best Actress	Cate Blanchett	Won	
Toronto Film Critics Association	January 8, 2023	Best Screenplay	Todd Field	Runner-up	
Vancouver Film Critics Circle	February 13, 2023	Best Film	Tár	Nominated	
Vancouver Film Critics Circle	February 13, 2023	Best Director	Todd Field	Nominated	
Vancouver Film Critics Circle	February 13, 2023	Best Actress	Cate Blanchett	Nominated	
Vancouver Film Critics Circle	February 13, 2023	Best Screenplay	Todd Field	Nominated	
Venice Film Festival	September 10, 2022	Golden Lion	Todd Field	Nominated	
Venice Film Festival	September 10, 2022	Queer Lion	Todd Field	Nominated	
Venice Film Festival	September 10, 2022	Volpi Cup for Best Actress	Cate Blanchett	Won	
Washington D.C. Area Film Critics Association	December 12, 2022	Best Film	Tár	Nominated	
Washington D.C. Area Film Critics Association	December 12, 2022	Best Director	Todd Field	Nominated	
Washington D.C. Area Film Critics Association	December 12, 2022	Best Actress	Cate Blanchett	Won	
Washington D.C. Area Film Critics Association	December 12, 2022	Best Original Screenplay	Todd Field	Nominated	
Washington D.C. Area Film Critics Association	December 12, 2022	Best Editing	Monika Willi	Nominated	
Washington D.C. Area Film Critics Association	December 12, 2022	Best Original Score	Hildur Guðnadóttir	Nominated	
Women Film Critics Circle	December 19, 2022	Best Actress	Cate Blanchett	Nominated	
Writers Guild of America Awards	March 5, 2023	Best Original Screenplay	Todd Field	Nominated	
