= New York Film Critics Circle Award for Best Film =

Award

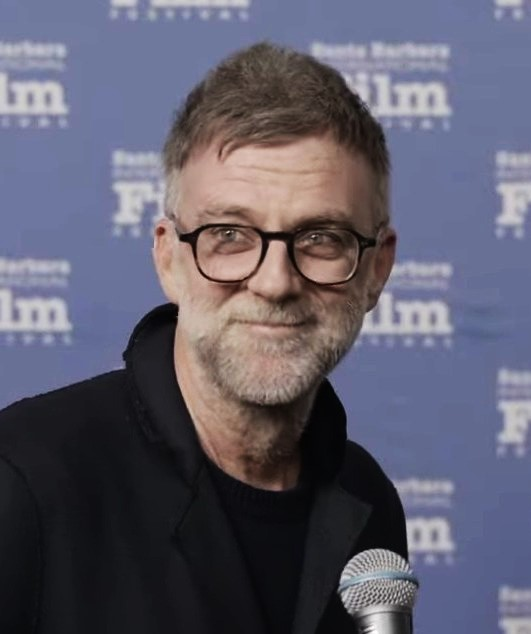
Filmmaker Paul Thomas Anderson, 2022

The New York Film Critics Circle Award for Best Picture is an award given by the New York Film Critics Circle, honoring the finest achievements in filmmaking.

== Winners ==
=== 1930s ===
Year	Winner	Director(s)
1935	The Informer	John Ford
1936	Mr. Deeds Goes to Town	Frank Capra
1937	The Life of Emile Zola	William Dieterle
1938	The Citadel	King Vidor
1939	Wuthering Heights	William Wyler

=== 1940s ===
Year	Winner	Director(s)
1940	The Grapes of Wrath	John Ford
1941	Citizen Kane	Orson Welles
1942	In Which We Serve	Noël Coward and David Lean
1943	Watch on the Rhine	Herman Shumlin
1944	Going My Way	Leo McCarey
1945	The Lost Weekend	Billy Wilder
1946	The Best Years of Our Lives	William Wyler
1947	Gentleman's Agreement	Elia Kazan
1948	The Treasure of the Sierra Madre	John Huston
1949	All the King's Men	Robert Rossen

=== 1950s ===
Year	Winner	Director(s)
1950	All About Eve	Joseph L. Mankiewicz
1951	A Streetcar Named Desire	Elia Kazan
1952	High Noon	Fred Zinnemann
1953	From Here to Eternity	Fred Zinnemann
1954	On the Waterfront	Elia Kazan
1955	Marty	Delbert Mann
1956	Around the World in 80 Days	Michael Anderson
1957	The Bridge on the River Kwai	David Lean
1958	The Defiant Ones	Stanley Kramer
1959	Ben-Hur	William Wyler

=== 1960s ===
Year	Winner	Director(s)
1960	The Apartment	Billy Wilder
1960	Sons and Lovers	Jack Cardiff
1961	West Side Story	Jerome Robbins and Robert Wise
1962	No award given (newspaper strike)	
1963	Tom Jones	Tony Richardson
1964	My Fair Lady	George Cukor
1965	Darling	John Schlesinger
1966	A Man for All Seasons	Fred Zinnemann
1967	In the Heat of the Night	Norman Jewison
1968	The Lion in Winter	Anthony Harvey
1969	Z	Costa-Gavras

=== 1970s ===
Year	Winner	Director(s)
1970	Five Easy Pieces	Bob Rafelson
1971	A Clockwork Orange	Stanley Kubrick
1972	Cries and Whispers	Ingmar Bergman
1973	Day for Night	François Truffaut
1974	Amarcord	Federico Fellini
1975	Nashville	Robert Altman
1976	All the President's Men	Alan J. Pakula
1977	Annie Hall	Woody Allen
1978	The Deer Hunter	Michael Cimino
1979	Kramer vs. Kramer	Robert Benton

=== 1980s ===
Year	Winner	Director(s)
1980	Ordinary People	Robert Redford
1981	Reds	Warren Beatty
1982	Gandhi	Richard Attenborough
1983	Terms of Endearment	James L. Brooks
1984	A Passage to India	David Lean
1985	Prizzi's Honor	John Huston
1986	Hannah and Her Sisters	Woody Allen
1987	Broadcast News	James L. Brooks
1988	The Accidental Tourist	Lawrence Kasdan
1989	My Left Foot	Jim Sheridan

=== 1990s ===
Year	Winner	Director(s)
1990	Goodfellas	Martin Scorsese
1991	The Silence of the Lambs	Jonathan Demme
1992	The Player	Robert Altman
1993	Schindler's List	Steven Spielberg
1994	Quiz Show	Robert Redford
1995	Leaving Las Vegas	Mike Figgis
1996	Fargo	Joel Coen
1997	L.A. Confidential	Curtis Hanson
1998	Saving Private Ryan	Steven Spielberg
1999	Topsy-Turvy	Mike Leigh

=== 2000s ===
Year	Winner	Director(s)
2000	Traffic	Steven Soderbergh
2001	Mulholland Drive	David Lynch
2002	Far from Heaven	Todd Haynes
2003	The Lord of the Rings: The Return of the King	Peter Jackson
2004	Sideways	Alexander Payne
2005	Brokeback Mountain	Ang Lee
2006	United 93	Paul Greengrass
2007	No Country for Old Men	Joel Coen and Ethan Coen
2008	Milk	Gus Van Sant
2009	The Hurt Locker	Kathryn Bigelow

=== 2010s ===
Year	Winner	Director(s)
2010	The Social Network	David Fincher
2011	The Artist	Michel Hazanavicius
2012	Zero Dark Thirty	Kathryn Bigelow
2013	American Hustle	David O. Russell
2014	Boyhood	Richard Linklater
2015	Carol	Todd Haynes
2016	La La Land	Damien Chazelle
2017	Lady Bird	Greta Gerwig
2018	Roma	Alfonso Cuarón
2019	The Irishman	Martin Scorsese

=== 2020s ===
Year	Winner	Director(s)
2020	First Cow	Kelly Reichardt
2021	Drive My Car	Ryusuke Hamaguchi
2022	Tár	Todd Field
2023	Killers of the Flower Moon	Martin Scorsese
2024	The Brutalist	Brady Corbet
2025	One Battle After Another	Paul Thomas Anderson

== See also ==
- Los Angeles Film Critics Association Award for Best Film
- Chicago Film Critics Association Award for Best Film
- Academy Award for Best Picture
