= Nonnie & Alex =

- Directed by: Todd Field
- Written by: Serena Rathbun
- Produced by: Douglas Axtell; Jody Teora
- Starring: Heather Ramsey; Travis Martin
- Cinematography: Mark Karen
- Edited by: Barry S. Silver
- Music by: James Legg
- Production company: Mercury Film
- Distributed by: PolyGram Filmed Entertainment
- Release date: January 17, 1995
- Running time: 30 minutes
- Country: United States
- Language: English

Nonnie & Alex is a 1995 short film that Todd Field directed while a fellow at the AFI Conservatory. It was filmed in Ferndale, California. This short film is a dramatic piece about two eight-year-old children, a girl (Nonnie) and boy (her friend, Alex) who are left to their own devices in trying to sort out whether or not Alex's recently deceased mother is truly haunting them.

== Awards ==
- Sundance Film Festival (Special Recognition Award)
- Aspen Short Fest (Best Film)
- Academy of Television Arts & Sciences (Emmy Award – Best College Film)
