= Sophie Kauer =

British and German artist (born 2001)

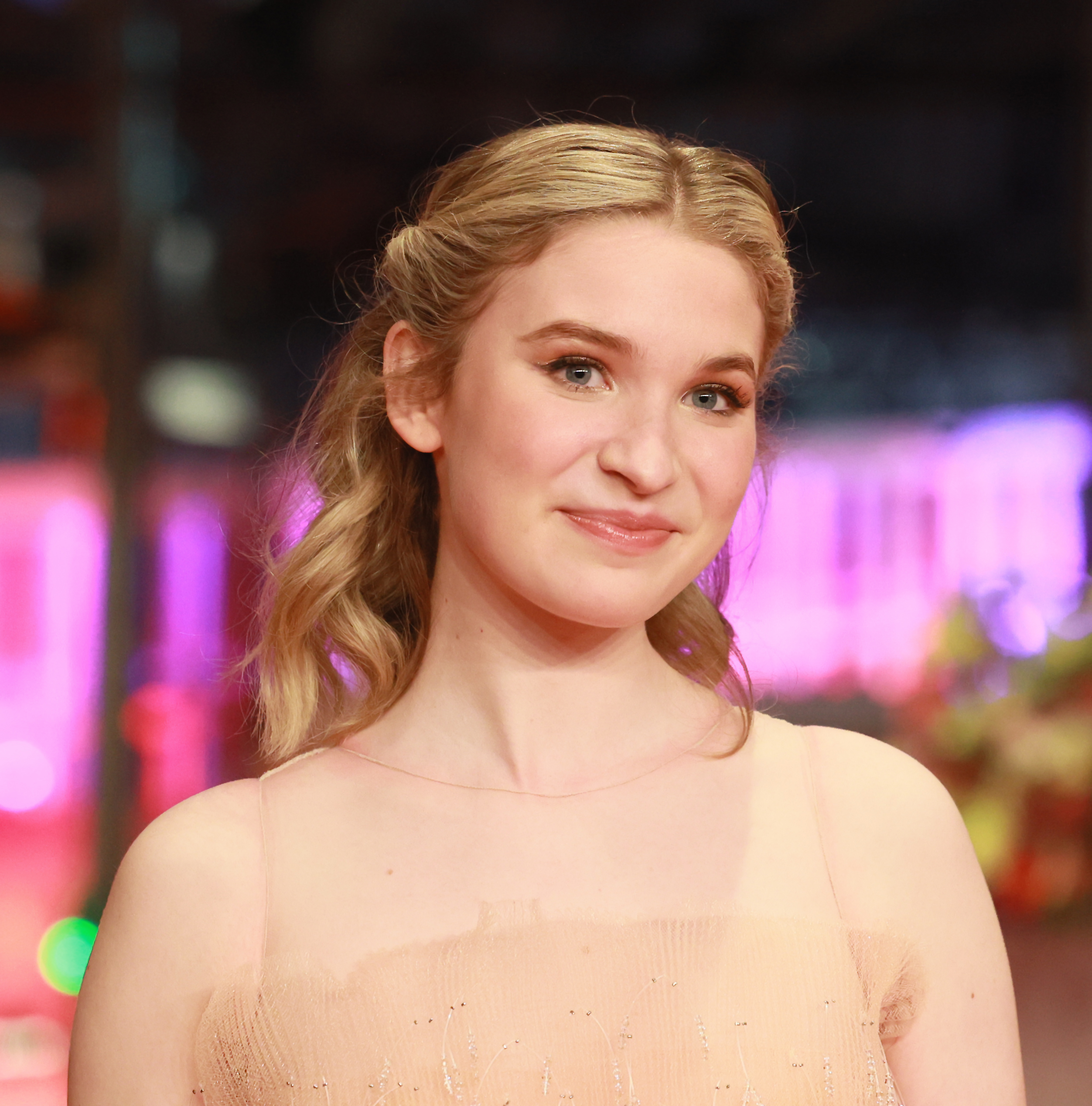
- Kauer at the Berlin International Film Festival in 2023
- Born: 2001 (age 24–25); London, U.K.
- Citizenship: United Kingdom; Germany
- Occupations: Actress; cellist
- Years active: 2022–present

Sophie Kauer (born 2001) is a British-German cellist and actress who made her screen debut in Todd Field’s Tár, starring alongside Cate Blanchett.

== Life and career ==
Kauer was born in London. At the age of 8 she began learning to play the cello; she was accepted 18 months later into the Junior Department of the Royal Academy of Music, where she studied with Melissa Phelps. She studied at the Academy on a scholarship for seven years and simultaneously attended Guildford High School.

In 2019 Kauer was named "Young Musician of the Year" by the Woking Music Festival. Since the autumn of 2020 Kauer has been studying at the Norwegian Academy of Music with Swedish cellist Torleif Thedéen.

Kauer was cast in the role of Olga in the 2022 film Tár; she had had little acting experience beforehand. According to interviews, she found out about the casting call in a Facebook post in February 2021. A friend had sent it encouraging her to try out. With COVID-19 lockdowns canceling in-person lessons and concerts, as well as restricting people from leaving their homes, Kauer decided to audition because she thought it was "really cool". She also said she had no expectations of success and believed Tár would be an "amazing way to bring classical music to the attention of a whole new audience". She auditioned via Zoom, then later received a call asking her to submit a recording of herself playing Edward Elgar’s Cello Concerto. After a week she was informed by Todd Field and casting director Avy Kaufman that her audition had been successful.

Kauer recorded portions of Elgar's Cello Concerto with the London Symphony Orchestra in the soundtrack album for Tár. Despite her role in the film, she said that playing the cello remains her focus.

On March 8, 2023, Kauer signed with Deutsche Grammophon. On April 25, 2023, the label announced that her performance of the first of Clara Schumann’s Three Romances, Op. 22, reached number one on the Classical On-Demand Audio Streaming chart, making Kauer "the youngest artist since the chart's inception to achieve this top position at just 21 years old".
