= Todd Field =

American filmmaker and actor (born 1964)

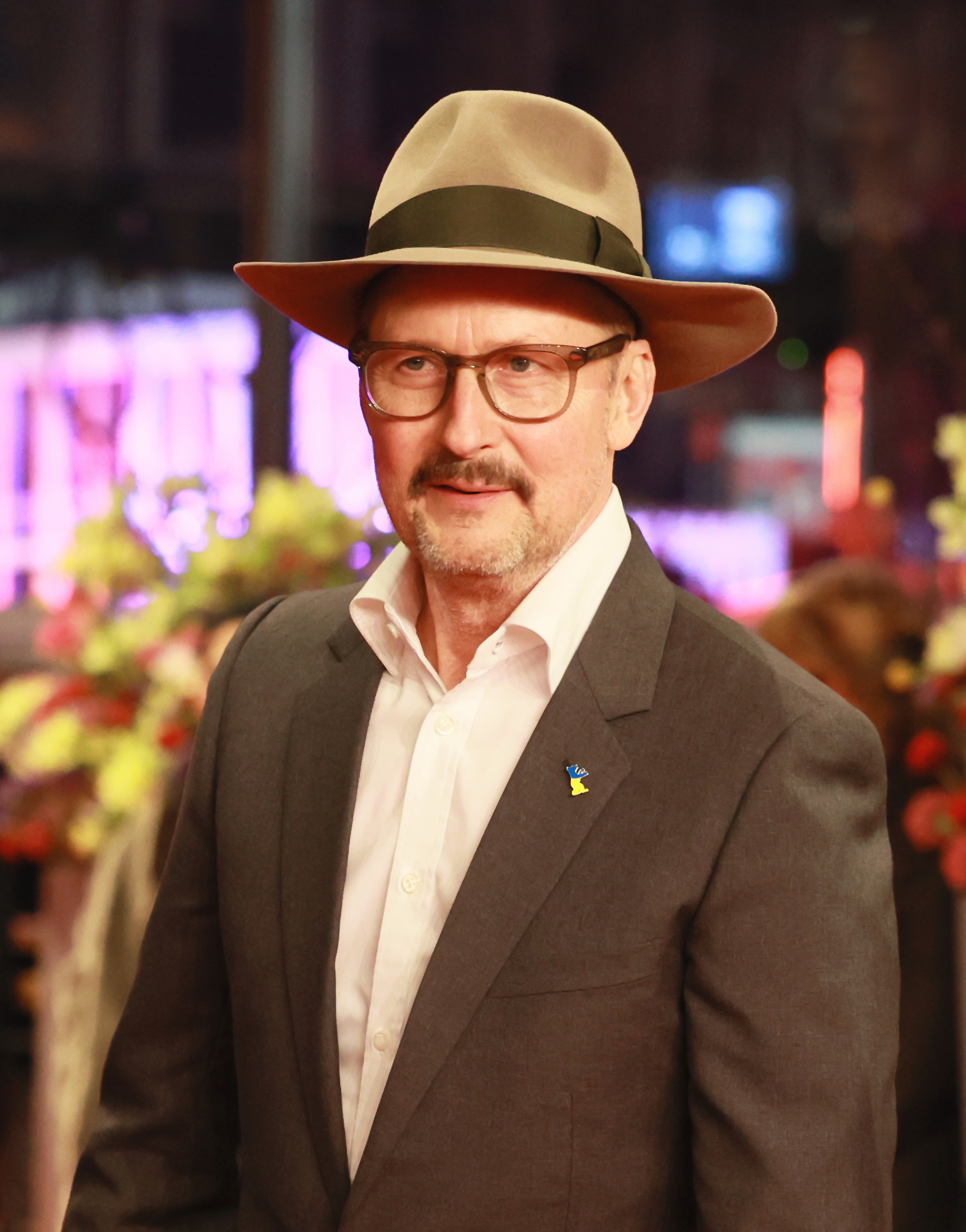
- Field attending the 73rd Berlin Film Festival in 2023
- Born: William Todd Field; February 24, 1964 (age 62); Pomona, California, U.S.
- Education: Mt. Hood Community College; Southern Oregon University; American Film Institute (MFA)
- Occupations: Filmmaker; actor
- Years active: 1985–present
- Spouse: Serena Rathbun (m. 1986)
- Children: 4

Signature
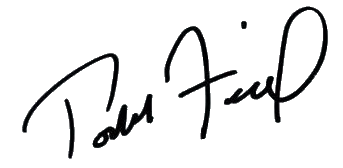

William Todd Field (born February 24, 1964) is an American filmmaker, actor and musician. He is known for directing In the Bedroom (2001), Little Children (2006), and Tár (2022), which were nominated for a combined fourteen Academy Awards. Field has personally received six Academy Award nominations for his films; two for Best Picture, two for Best Adapted Screenplay, one for Best Director, and one for Best Original Screenplay.

Before establishing himself as a filmmaker, Field appeared as an actor in such films as Woody Allen's Radio Days (1987), Victor Nuñez's Ruby in Paradise (1993), Nicole Holofcener's Walking and Talking (1996), and Stanley Kubrick's Eyes Wide Shut (1999).

He also co-created the concept for bubble gum brand Big League Chew.

== Early life and education ==
Field at Portland, Oregon's Civic Stadium in 1977

Field was born in Pomona, California, where his family ran a poultry farm. When Field turned two, his family moved to Portland, Oregon, where his father went to work as a salesman, and his mother became a school librarian. At an early age, he became interested in performing sleight-of-hand and later music.

As a child in Portland, Field was a bat boy for the Portland Mavericks, a single A independent minor league baseball team owned by Hollywood actor Bing Russell. Kurt Russell, Bing's son and later an actor in his own right, also played for the Portland Mavericks during this time. Field and Mavericks pitching coach Rob Nelson created the first batch of Big League Chew in the Field family kitchen. In 1980, Nelson and former New York Yankees all-star Jim Bouton sold the idea to the Wrigley Company. Since that time more than a billion pouches have been sold worldwide.

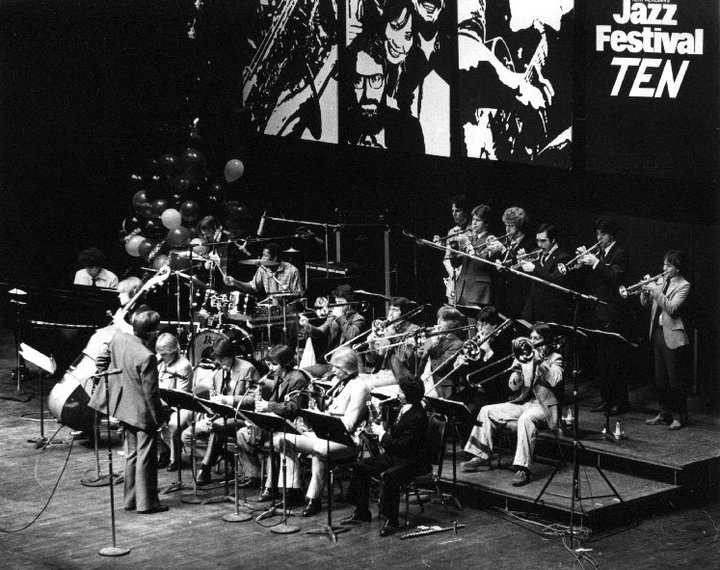
The Lab Band, 1982

A budding jazz musician, at the age of sixteen Field became a member of the Lab Band at Mount Hood Community College in Gresham, Oregon. Headed by Larry McVey, the band had become a proving-ground and regular stop for Stan Kenton and Mel Tormé when they were looking for new players. It was here Field played trombone along with his friend, trumpeter and future Grammy Award Winner Chris Botti. During this same time he also worked as a non-union projectionist at a second-run movie theater. Field graduated with his class from Centennial High School on Portland's east side and briefly attended Southern Oregon State College (now Southern Oregon University) in Ashland on a music scholarship, but left after his freshman year favoring a move to New York to study acting with Robert X. Modica at his renowned Carnegie Hall Studio. Soon after, Field began performing with the Ark Theatre Company as both an actor and musician.

== Career ==
=== 1987–1999: Acting career ===
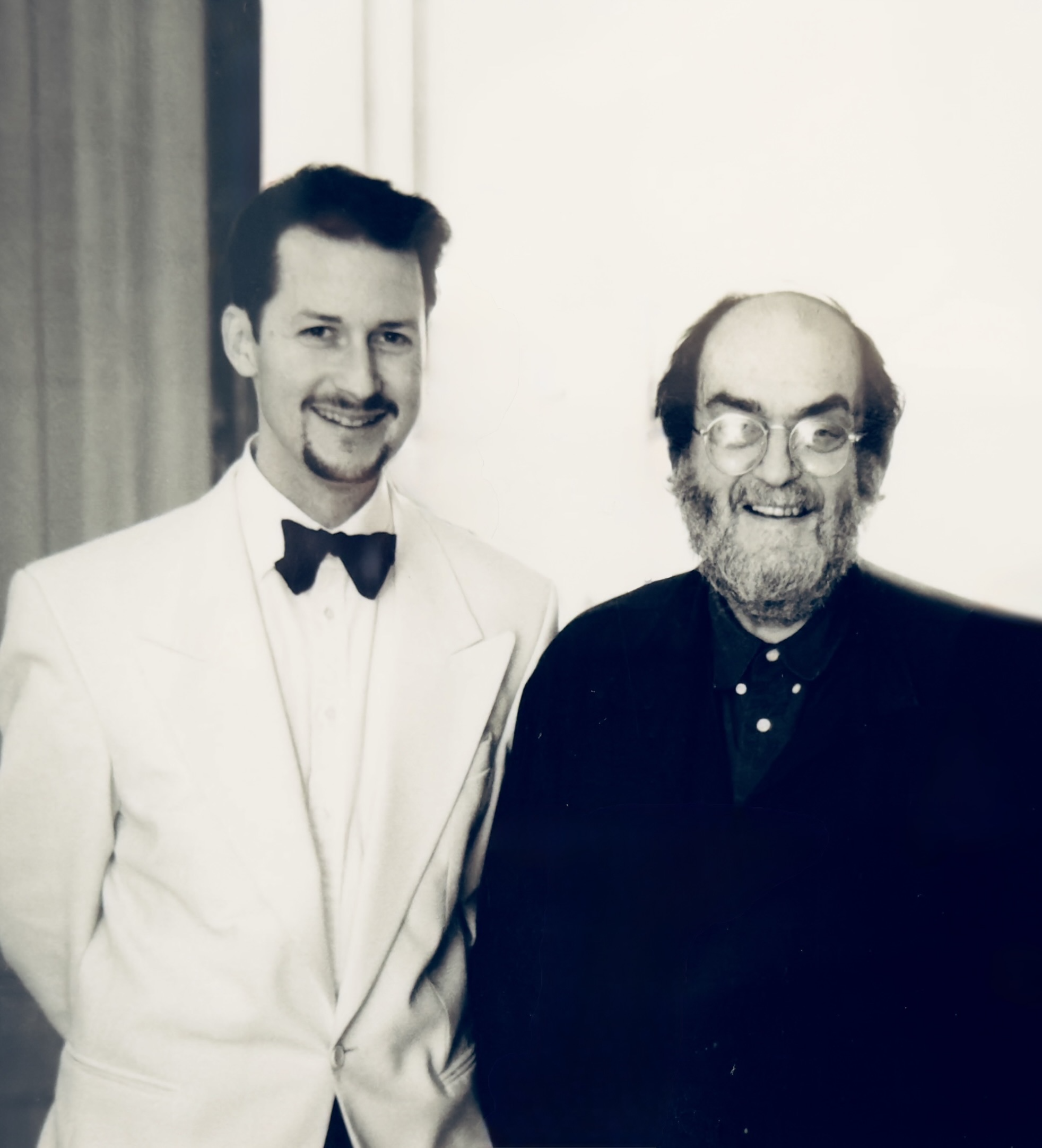
Field and Stanley Kubrick on set of Eyes Wide Shut, 1998

Field first appeared in motion pictures after Woody Allen cast him in Radio Days (1987), and went on to work with filmmakers such as Stanley Kubrick, Victor Nuñez, and Carl Franklin.

Kevin Thomas of the Los Angeles Times summarized Field's acting career in his review of Broken Vessels (1999):

"Field has a deceptive facade of all-American clean-cut looks that allows him to suggest a wide range of emotions and thoughts behind such a regular-guy appearance; in Ruby in Paradise he expressed such uncommon decency and intelligence you had to wonder how Ashley Judd's hardscrabble Ruby could ever have considered letting him get away. In Eyes Wide Shut he's the likable med school dropout turned saloon piano player, and here he's an increasingly raging sociopath. In all these roles Field has the precious gift of being able to surprise you and to command your attention on screen."

Franklin and Nuñez, both AFI alumni, encouraged Field to enroll as a Directing Fellow at the AFI Conservatory, which he did in 1992. His thesis film, Nonnie & Alex, received a Jury Prize at the 1995 Sundance Film Festival. Other short films he made outside of school were exhibited at venues overseas and domestically at the Museum of Modern Art.

=== 2000–2005: Acclaim as a director ===
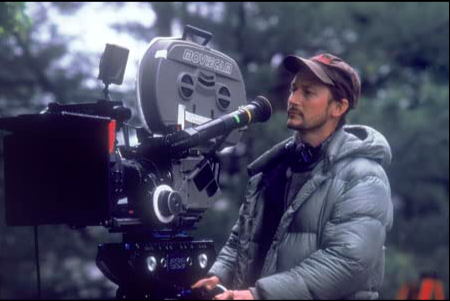
Filming In the Bedroom, 2000

Field began his filmmaking career in 2001 when he wrote and directed In the Bedroom, a film based on Andre Dubus's short story "Killings". (Kubrick and Dubus were among Field's mentors; both died right before the production of In the Bedroom.) In the Bedroom was nominated for five Academy Awards including Best Picture, Best Actor (Tom Wilkinson, his first nomination), Best Actress (Sissy Spacek, her sixth), Supporting Actress (Marisa Tomei, her second), and Best Adapted Screenplay. The film was shot in Rockland, Maine, a New England town where Field resides. The house where he, his wife (Serena Rathbun), and their four children live was even used as the setting for one sequence. Rathbun and Spacek did some of the set design and Field handled the camera himself on many of the shots.

In the Bedroom made its debut at the 2001 Sundance Film Festival, and was the first film to premiere there ever to receive an Academy Award nomination for Best Picture. Dennis Lim wrote in the Village Voice:

"Todd Field's debut feature, In the Bedroom, alighted on the snowy peaks of Sundance last January as if from another universe. Here was a small miracle of patience and composure, so starkly removed from everything the festival had come to represent that it seemed almost to herald the overdue coming-of-age of American independent film."

Upon the film's release David Ansen of Newsweek wrote:

"Todd Field exhibits a mastery of his craft many filmmakers never acquire in a lifetime. With one film he's guaranteed his future as a director. He has the magnificent obsession of the natural-born filmmaker."

Anthony Quinn of The Independent stated,

"Field has pulled off something here I thought no American filmmaker would ever manage again: he makes violence feel genuinely shocking."

For his work on In the Bedroom, Field was named Director of the Year by the National Board of Review, and his script was awarded Best Original Screenplay. The film was named Best Picture of the Year by the Los Angeles Film Critics Association, and the New York Film Critics Circle awarded Field Best First Film. In the Bedroom received six American Film Institute Awards, including Best Picture, Director, and Screenplay, three Golden Globe nominations, and five Academy Award nominations, including Best Picture, Actor, Actress, Supporting Actress, and two individually for Field as screenwriter and producer. The American Film Institute honored Field with the Franklin Schaffner Alumni Medal.

The March 2023 issue of New York magazine listed In the Bedroom alongside Citizen Kane, Sunset Boulevard, Dr. Strangelove, Butch Cassidy and the Sundance Kid, The Conversation, Nashville, Taxi Driver, The Elephant Man, Pulp Fiction, There Will Be Blood, Roma, and Tár, also directed by Field, as "The Best Movies That Lost Best Picture at the Oscars".

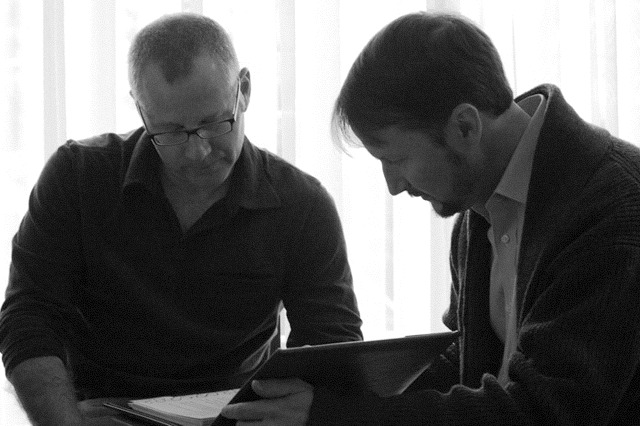
Perrotta and Field working on the script for Little Children, 2005

After years spent doing research for a biopic of 19th-century stage actor Edwin Booth titled Time Between Trains, Field resurfaced with Little Children in 2006. The film was nominated for three Academy Awards, including two for the actors: Kate Winslet (her fifth nomination, and with it a record for the youngest actor to be nominated for five Academy Awards) and Jackie Earle Haley (his first nomination and first major role in over 15 years). With just two films, Field had garnered five Academy Award nominations for his actors and three for himself. Initially conceived as a miniseries, the film, based on Tom Perrotta's novel of the same name, made its premiere at the 2006 New York Film Festival.

A. O. Scott of The New York Times wrote:

Mr. Field proves to be among the most literary of American filmmakers. In too many recent movies intelligence is woefully undervalued, and it is this quality—even more than its considerable beauty—that distinguishes Little Children from its peers. A movie that is challenging, accessible, and hard to stop thinking about.

International Cinephile Society's Matt Mazur called the film "subversive" and designed to disorient the viewer with "seemingly non-connected imagery to suggest a tone and a mood of disquiet." Mazur compared Field's technique with that of Sergei Eisenstein, D. W. Griffith, Georges Méliès, and Edwin S. Porter.

Many members of Field's creative team on In the Bedroom returned to work with him on the film, including Serena Rathbun. In a 2006 interview with The Hollywood Reporter's Anne Thompson, Field said he quit acting and began making his own films after Rathbun told him, "Do what you want to do. Don't get distracted." Later that year, Field spoke extensively about the importance of Rathbun as his creative partner, describing a conversation he had with her where she gave him the most pivotal scene: "for me, the film is unthinkable without it."

=== 2006–2021: Unrealized projects ===
After Little Children, Field went fifteen years without directing another film, which various journalists lamented, prompting speculation as far back as 2010 that the filmmaker had become somewhat of a recluse. That year the Playlist's Kevin Jagernauth wrote, "It’s four long years since Todd Field’s extraordinary and excellent Little Children, and we’ve heard very little from the director since." And Nicholas Bell in his 2015 Ioncinema piece, "Top 10 American Indie Filmmakers Missing in Action," states "It is definitely time for Field to throw one down the middle. In the meantime, we’ll just have to watch In the Bedroom for the umpteenth time."

However, during this period Field did write a number of film and television projects that never came to fruition, including adaptations of the novels Blood Meridian, Beautiful Ruins and Purity. He also worked for almost a decade on a film adaptation of the 2010 Boston Teran novel The Creed of Violence, set during the Mexican Revolution, which at different times was set to star Leonardo DiCaprio, Christian Bale and Daniel Craig. It had also been reported that Field might direct a coming-of-age script set in the 1970s Northwest based on his experiences with the Minor League Baseball team the Portland Mavericks, that Kurt Russell was involved in.

Speaking publicly for the first time in sixteen years, Field told The New York Times in 2022, "I set my sights in a very particular way on certain material that was probably very tough to get made." Later, when asked if he would ever consider reviving any of his past projects, Field replied "[They're] kind of like a family plot. You have these little headstones, and you have a passing acquaintance with and occasionally drop flowers on, but I don't want to dig any of them up."

Over those same years Field worked in advertising, directing spots for such brands as Xbox, Captain Morgan, Corona, BMW, NASCAR and GE. Reflecting on his advertising work over these years he stated "I've been directing constantly, I feel much stronger as a director than I ever felt with those previous films."

=== 2022–present: Return with Tár ===
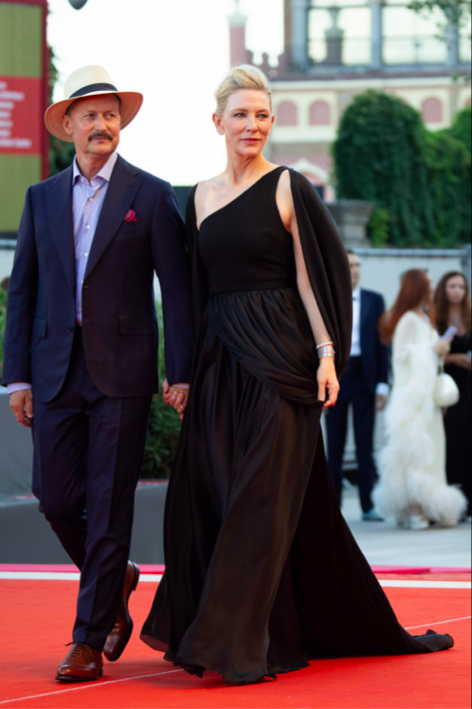
Field and Blanchett at 79th Venice International Film Festival

Field's third film, Tár, starring Cate Blanchett as the fictional conductor/composer Lydia Tár, premiered at the 79th Venice International Film Festival, where it competed for the Golden Lion and Queer Lion, with Blanchett winning the Volpi Cup for Best Actress. Ahead of the Festival, Peter Kujawski, the chairman of Focus Features, told the Associated Press, "Todd Field is as major a film artist as has ever been." The film had a limited theatrical release in the United States on October 7, 2022, before its wide release on October 28, 2022, and International theatrical release that began first in the UK on 13 January 2023. Tár received six nominations for the 95th Academy Awards, including Best Picture, Best Director and Best Original Screenplay for Field, and Best Actress for Blanchett, and five nominations from the 76th British Academy Film Awards, including Best Picture, Best Director, Best Actress, Best Sound, and Best Screenplay of the Year.

For his work on Tár, Field was nominated by the Directors Guild of America for Best Director, the Producers Guild of America for Best Film, and the Writers Guild of America for Best Original Screenplay. He was named Best Director of the Year by the London Film Critics' Circle and Los Angeles Film Critics Association, and his script named Best Original Screenplay.

Tár is the fourth film in history to be named Best of the Year by the New York Film Critics Circle, the Los Angeles Film Critics Association, the London Film Critics' Circle as well as the National Society of Film Critics. More critics listed the film Best of the Year than any other released in 2022, including The Atlantic, Entertainment Weekly, The Guardian, The Hollywood Reporter, Screen Daily, Vanity Fair, and Variety; plus, IndieWire's annual poll of 165 critics worldwide who also named Field "Best Director of the Year" and his script "Best Screenplay."

Owen Gleiberman in his Venice Film Festival Daily Variety review wrote:

"Let me say right up front: It's the work of a master filmmaker... Tár is not a judgement so much as a statement you can make your own judgment about. The statement is: We're in a new world."

A. O. Scott of The New York Times writing from the Telluride Film Festival and later from the New York Film Festival stated,

"I'm not sure I've ever seen a movie quite like Tár. Field balances Apollonian restraint with Dionysian frenzy. Tár is meticulously controlled and also scarily wild. Field finds a new way of posing the perennial question about separating the artist from the art, a question that he suggests can only be answered by another question: are you crazy? We don't care about Tár because she's an artist. We care about her because she's art."

Robbie Collin, of The Daily Telegraph, wrote:

"Field himself was a protégé of Stanley Kubrick, and Tár feels Kubrickian in many respects: its formal mastery, its exceptional acting, its atmosphere that clings like mist. But like Kubrick’s own projects, it’s something you really never have seen before.”

Martin Scorsese presenting Best Film of the Year to Field at the 2022 New York Film Critics Circle Awards, praised his filmmaking saying, "For so long now, so many of us see films that pretty much let us know where they're going... but that's on dark days. The clouds lifted when I experienced Todd's film, Tár." Paul Thomas Anderson praised Field when presenting him with his Director Medallion at the 75th annual DGA Awards saying, "Every detail matters in this film. Nothing is not deliberate or full of intention. It's directed with such perfectly controlled mayhem and glee by Todd, it's really hard not to drool as another director."

Tár is widely regarded as one of the greatest films of the 21st century.

== Style and influences ==
In an essay for the Los Angeles Times, Field wrote about Ingmar Bergman's influence on him, "He was our tunnel man building the aqueducts of our cinematic collective unconscious. Supplying water to a people who heretofore didn't know they were thirsty." In a Criterion Closet appearance with Cate Blanchett, Field told her he believed Bergman's Summer with Monika contained the "greatest close up in history".

On Josh Olson and Joe Dante's The Movies That Made Me podcast, Field listed ten of his favorite films, which included Man with a Movie Camera (1929), The Big Parade (1925), The Servant (1963), I Am Cuba (1964), Shadows of Forgotten Ancestors (1965), Butch Cassidy and the Sundance Kid (1969), Murmur of the Heart (1971), Opening Night (1977), The Meetings of Anna (1978) and No End (1985).

Field has cited George Roy Hill, Alan J. Pakula, John Ford, Stanley Kubrick and Steven Spielberg as the directors who inspired him when he was a young person.

== Filmography ==
=== Filmmaker ===
| Year | Title | Director | Writer | Producer | Notes | Ref. |
Feature films
| 2001 | In the Bedroom | Yes | Yes | Yes | | |
| 2006 | Little Children | Yes | Yes | Yes | | |
| 2022 | Tár | Yes | Yes | Yes | | |
Short films
| 1992 | Too Romantic | Yes | Yes | No | AFI First Year Cycle Project | |
| 1993 | When I Was a Boy | Yes | No | No | Co-director with Alex Vlacos and Matthew Modine | |
| 1993 | The Dog | Yes | No | No | Co-director with Alex Vlacos | |
| 1993 | The Tree | Yes | Yes | No | AFI First Year Cycle Project | |
| 1993 | Delivering | Yes | Yes | No | AFI First Year Cycle Project | |
| 1995 | Nonnie & Alex | Yes | No | No | AFI Second Year Thesis Project | |
| 2023 | The Fundraiser | Yes | Yes | Yes | Created for Berlinale 2023 | |
Music videos
| 2022 | "Mortar" | Yes | Yes | Yes | Music video | |
Television
| 1999 | Once and Again | Yes | No | No | Episode: "Outside Hearts" | |
| 2005 | Carnivàle | Yes | No | No | Episode: "Cheyenne, WY" | |

=== Actor ===
Film
| Year | Title | Role | Director | Ref. |
|---|---|---|---|---|
| 1987 | Radio Days | Crooner | Woody Allen | |
| 1987 | The Allnighter | Bellhop | Tamar Simon Hoffs | |
| 1988 | Eye of the Eagle 2: Inside the Enemy | Private Anthony Glenn | Carl Franklin | |
| 1988 | The End of Innocence | Richard | Dyan Cannon | |
| 1988 | Back to Back | Todd Brand | John Kincaide | |
| 1989 | Fat Man and Little Boy | Robert Rathbun Wilson | Roland Joffe | |
| 1989 | Gross Anatomy | David Schreiner | Thom Eberhardt | |
| 1990 | Full Fathom Five | Johnson | Carl Franklin | |
| 1991 | Queens Logic | Cecil | Steve Rash | |
| 1993 | Ruby in Paradise | Mike McCaslin | Victor Nuñez | |
| 1994 | Sleep with Me | Duane | Rory Kelly | |
| 1996 | Twister | Tim 'Beltzer' Lewis | Jan de Bont | |
| 1996 | Walking and Talking | Frank | Nicole Holofcener | |
| 1999 | Broken Vessels | Jimmy Warzniack | Scott Ziehl | |
| 1999 | Eyes Wide Shut | Nick Nightingale | Stanley Kubrick | |
| 1999 | The Haunting | Todd Hackett | Jan de Bont | |
| 2000 | Net Worth | Thad Davis | Kenny Griswold | |
| 2000 | Stranger than Fiction | Austin Walker/Donovan Miller | Eric Bross | |
| 2001 | New Port South | Walsh | Kyle Cooper | |
| 2002 | Rip It Off | Jack Toretti | Gigi Gaston | |
| 2005 | The Second Front | Nicolas Raus | Dmitri Fiks | |
Television
| Year | Title | Role | Notes | Ref. |
| 1986 | Lance et compte | Anders Johansson | 5 episodes | |
| 1987 | Gimme a Break! | Eric | 2 episodes | |
| 1987 | Hard Knocks | Chad | Episode: "Captain Justice" | |
| 1987 | Brothers | Walter | Episode: "Penny and the Hard Hat" | |
| 1987 | Student Exchange | Neil Barton/Adriano Fabrizzi | Television movie | |
| 1987 | Take Five | Kevin Davis | 6 episodes | |
| 1988 | Roseanne | Charles | Episode: "D-I-V-O-R-C-E" | |
| 1990 | Tales from the Crypt | Eugene | Episode: "Judy, You're Not Yourself Today" | |
| 1991 | Lookwell | Jason | Television pilot | |
| 1993 | Danger Theatre | Ray Monroe | Episode: "Searcher in the Mist/Sex, Lies & Decaf" | |
| 1993 | Bakersfield P.D. | Lewis | Episode: "The Poker Game" | |
| 1995 | Chicago Hope | Josh Taubler | Episode: "Heartbreak" | |
| 1998 | Cupid | Sam | Episode: "Pick-Up Schticks" | |
| 1999–2001 | Once and Again | David Cassilli | 28 episodes | |
| 2002–2003 | Aqua Teen Hunger Force | Ol' Drippy | Voice, 2 episodes | |

== Awards and nominations ==
| Organizations | Year | Category | Work | Result | Ref. |
|---|---|---|---|---|---|
| Academy Awards | 2001 | Best Picture | In the Bedroom | Nominated | |
| Academy Awards | 2001 | Best Adapted Screenplay | In the Bedroom | Nominated | |
| Academy Awards | 2006 | Best Adapted Screenplay | Little Children | Nominated | |
| Academy Awards | 2022 | Best Picture | Tár | Nominated | |
| Academy Awards | 2022 | Best Director | Tár | Nominated | |
| Academy Awards | 2022 | Best Original Screenplay | Tár | Nominated | |
| AFI Awards | 2001 | Director of the Year | In the Bedroom | Nominated | |
| AFI Awards | 2001 | Screenwriter of the Year | In the Bedroom | Nominated | |
| American Film Institute Awards | 2022 | Film of the Year | Tár | Won | |
| British Academy Film Awards | 2023 | Best Film | Tár | Nominated | |
| British Academy Film Awards | 2023 | Best Director | Tár | Nominated | |
| British Academy Film Awards | 2023 | Best Original Screenplay | Tár | Nominated | |
| British Film Institute | 2001 | Satyajit Ray Award | In the Bedroom | Won | |
| Camerimage | 2022 | Golden Frog | Tár (Shared with Florian Hoffmeister) | Won | |
| Directors Guild of America Awards | 2022 | Outstanding Directing - Feature Film | Tár | Nominated | |
| Film Independent Spirit Awards | 1993 | Best Supporting Male | Ruby in Paradise | Nominated | |
| Film Independent Spirit Awards | 2001 | Best First Feature | In the Bedroom | Won | |
| Film Independent Spirit Awards | 2001 | Best Screenplay | In the Bedroom | Nominated | |
| Film Independent Spirit Awards | 2022 | Best Feature | Tár | Nominated | |
| Film Independent Spirit Awards | 2022 | Best Director | Tár | Nominated | |
| Film Independent Spirit Awards | 2022 | Best Screenplay | Tár | Nominated | |
| Golden Globe Awards | 2006 | Best Screenplay - Motion Picture | Little Children | Nominated | |
| Golden Globe Awards | 2022 | Best Screenplay - Motion Picture | Tár | Nominated | |
| Gotham Awards | 2006 | Best Feature | Little Children | Nominated | |
| Gotham Awards | 2022 | Best Feature | Tár | Nominated | |
| Gotham Awards | 2022 | Best Screenplay | Tár | Won | |
| London Film Critics' Circle | 2022 | Film of the Year | Tár | Won | |
| London Film Critics' Circle | 2022 | Director of the Year | Tár | Won | |
| London Film Critics' Circle | 2022 | Screenwriter of the Year | Tár | Nominated | |
| Los Angeles Film Critics Association | 2001 | Best Film | In the Bedroom | Won | |
| Los Angeles Film Critics Association | 2022 | Best Film | Tár | Won | |
| Los Angeles Film Critics Association | 2022 | Best Director | Tár | Won | |
| Los Angeles Film Critics Association | 2022 | Best Screenplay | Tár | Won | |
| National Board of Review | 2001 | Best Director | In the Bedroom | Won | |
| National Board of Review | 2001 | Best Screenplay | In the Bedroom | Won | |
| National Society of Film Critics | 2022 | Best Film | Tár | Won | |
| National Society of Film Critics | 2022 | Best Screenplay | Tár | Won | |
| New York Film Critics Circle | 2001 | Best First Film | In the Bedroom | Won | |
| New York Film Critics Circle | 2001 | Best Director | In the Bedroom | Runner-up | |
| New York Film Critics Circle | 2022 | Best Film | Tár | Won | |
| Producers Guild of America Awards | 2023 | Best Theatrical Motion Picture | Tár | Nominated | |
| Sundance Film Festival | 1995 | Special Jury Award | Nonnie & Alex | Won | |
| Sundance Film Festival | 2001 | Grand Jury Prize | In the Bedroom | Nominated | |
| Venice International Film Festival | 2022 | Golden Lion | Tár | Nominated | |
| Venice International Film Festival | 2022 | Queer Lion | Tár | Nominated | |
| Writers Guild of America Awards | 2006 | Best Adapted Screenplay | Little Children | Nominated | |
| Writers Guild of America Awards | 2022 | Best Original Screenplay | Tár | Nominated | |

Accolades for Field's directed motion pictures
| Year | Motion Picture | Academy Awards | | BAFTAs | | Golden Globes | |
| Year | Motion Picture | Nominations | Wins | Nominations | Wins | Nominations | Wins |
|---|---|---|---|---|---|---|---|
| 2001 | In the Bedroom | 5 | | 2 | | 3 | 1 |
| 2006 | Little Children | 3 | | 1 | | 3 | |
| 2022 | Tár | 6 | | 5 | 1 | 3 | 1 |
| Total | | 14 | | 8 | 1 | 9 | 2 |

== Directed Academy Award performances ==
Under Field's direction, these actors have received the Academy Award nominations for their performances in their respective roles.

| Year | Performer | Title | Result |
|---|---|---|---|
Academy Award for Best Actor
| 2001 | Tom Wilkinson | In the Bedroom | Nominated |
Academy Award for Best Actress
| 2001 | Sissy Spacek | In the Bedroom | Nominated |
| 2006 | Kate Winslet | Little Children | Nominated |
| 2022 | Cate Blanchett | Tár | Nominated |
Academy Award for Best Supporting Actor
| 2006 | Jackie Earle Haley | Little Children | Nominated |
Academy Award for Best Supporting Actress
| 2001 | Marisa Tomei | In the Bedroom | Nominated |
