= Los Angeles Film Critics Association Award for Best Film =

Annual US film award

The Los Angeles Film Critics Association Award for Best Film is an award given annually by the Los Angeles Film Critics Association.

== Notes ==
- ≈ indicates an Academy Award for Best Picture winner
- ± indicates an Academy Award for Best Picture nominee

== Winners ==
=== 1970s ===
Year	Film	Director
1975	Dog Day Afternoon±	Sidney Lumet
1975	One Flew Over the Cuckoo's Nest≈	Miloš Forman
1976	Network±	Sidney Lumet
1976	Rocky≈	John G. Avildsen
1977	Star Wars±	George Lucas
1978	Coming Home±	Hal Ashby
1979	Kramer vs. Kramer≈	Robert Benton

=== 1980s ===
Year	Film	Director
1980	Raging Bull±	Martin Scorsese
1981	Atlantic City±	Louis Malle
1982	E.T. the Extra-Terrestrial±	Steven Spielberg
1983	Terms of Endearment≈	James L. Brooks
1984	Amadeus≈	Miloš Forman
1985	Brazil	Terry Gilliam
1986	Hannah and Her Sisters±	Woody Allen
1987	Hope and Glory±	John Boorman
1988	Little Dorrit	Christine Edzard
1989	Do the Right Thing	Spike Lee

=== 1990s ===
Year	Film	Director
1990	Goodfellas±	Martin Scorsese
1991	Bugsy±	Barry Levinson
1992	Unforgiven≈	Clint Eastwood
1993	Schindler's List≈	Steven Spielberg
1994	Pulp Fiction±	Quentin Tarantino
1995	Leaving Las Vegas	Mike Figgis
1996	Secrets & Lies±	Mike Leigh
1997	L.A. Confidential±	Curtis Hanson
1998	Saving Private Ryan±	Steven Spielberg
1999	The Insider±	Michael Mann

=== 2000s ===
Year	Film	Director
2000	Crouching Tiger, Hidden Dragon (Wo hu cang long)±	Ang Lee
2001	In the Bedroom±	Todd Field
2002	About Schmidt	Alexander Payne
2003	American Splendor	Shari Springer Berman and Robert Pulcini
2004	Sideways±	Alexander Payne
2005	Brokeback Mountain±	Ang Lee
2006	Letters from Iwo Jima±	Clint Eastwood
2007	There Will Be Blood±	Paul Thomas Anderson
2008	WALL-E	Andrew Stanton
2009	The Hurt Locker≈	Kathryn Bigelow

=== 2010s ===
Year	Film	Director
2010	The Social Network±	David Fincher
2011	The Descendants±	Alexander Payne
2012	Amour±	Michael Haneke
2013	Gravity±	Alfonso Cuarón
2013	Her±	Spike Jonze
2014	Boyhood±	Richard Linklater
2015	Spotlight≈	Tom McCarthy
2016	Moonlight≈	Barry Jenkins
2017	Call Me by Your Name±	Luca Guadagnino
2018	Roma±	Alfonso Cuarón
2019	Parasite≈	Bong Joon-ho

=== 2020s ===
Year	Film	Director
2020	Small Axe	Steve McQueen
2021	Drive My Car±	Ryusuke Hamaguchi
2022	Everything Everywhere All At Once≈	Daniel Kwan and Daniel Scheinert
2022	TÁR±	Todd Field
2023	The Zone of Interest±	Jonathan Glazer
2024	Anora≈	Sean Baker
2025	One Battle After Another≈	Paul Thomas Anderson
