= The New Yorker Festival =

Annual event organized by The New Yorker magazine

The New Yorker Festival is an annual event organized by The New Yorker magazine. It is held in venues in and around New York City, typically in early October, bringing together "a who's-who of the arts, politics and everything in between." The festival was first held in May 2000 in celebration of the magazine's 75th anniversary and has since become "one of the buzziest cultural events of the year" as well as "the biggest consumer-facing event for the magazine's parent company Condé Nast.

== Manning appearance, 2017 ==
In a reportedly "tense moment" at the 2017 festival, former intelligence analyst Chelsea Manning was interviewed by New Yorker staff writer Larissa MacFarquhar, and responded to speculation that information in documents she'd shared with WikiLeaks in 2010 was sensitive enough to cause "harm to other intelligence officers, informants, or ongoing Army operations."

== Bannon controversy, 2018 ==
In 2018, The New Yorker announced that Steve Bannon, former chief executive of Donald Trump's 2016 presidential campaign and former Breitbart chief executive chairman, would be a headliner at the year's festival. The magazine's editor, David Remnick, initially defended the invitation, saying that he had “every intention of asking [Bannon] difficult questions and engaging in a serious and even combative conversation,” but after severe backlash and the announcement that other stars, such as Judd Apatow, Jim Carrey, and Patton Oswalt, would not participate in the festival if Bannon attended, the magazine's editor uninvited Bannon.
