= 2022 New York Film Critics Circle Awards =

88th New York Film Critics Circle Awards

88th NYFCC Awards
- Date: December 2, 2022

Highlights
- Best Picture: Tár

The 88th New York Film Critics Circle Awards, honoring the best in film for 2022, were announced on December 2, 2022.

The annual gala awards dinner took place at Tao Downtown in New York on January 4, 2023.

== Winners ==
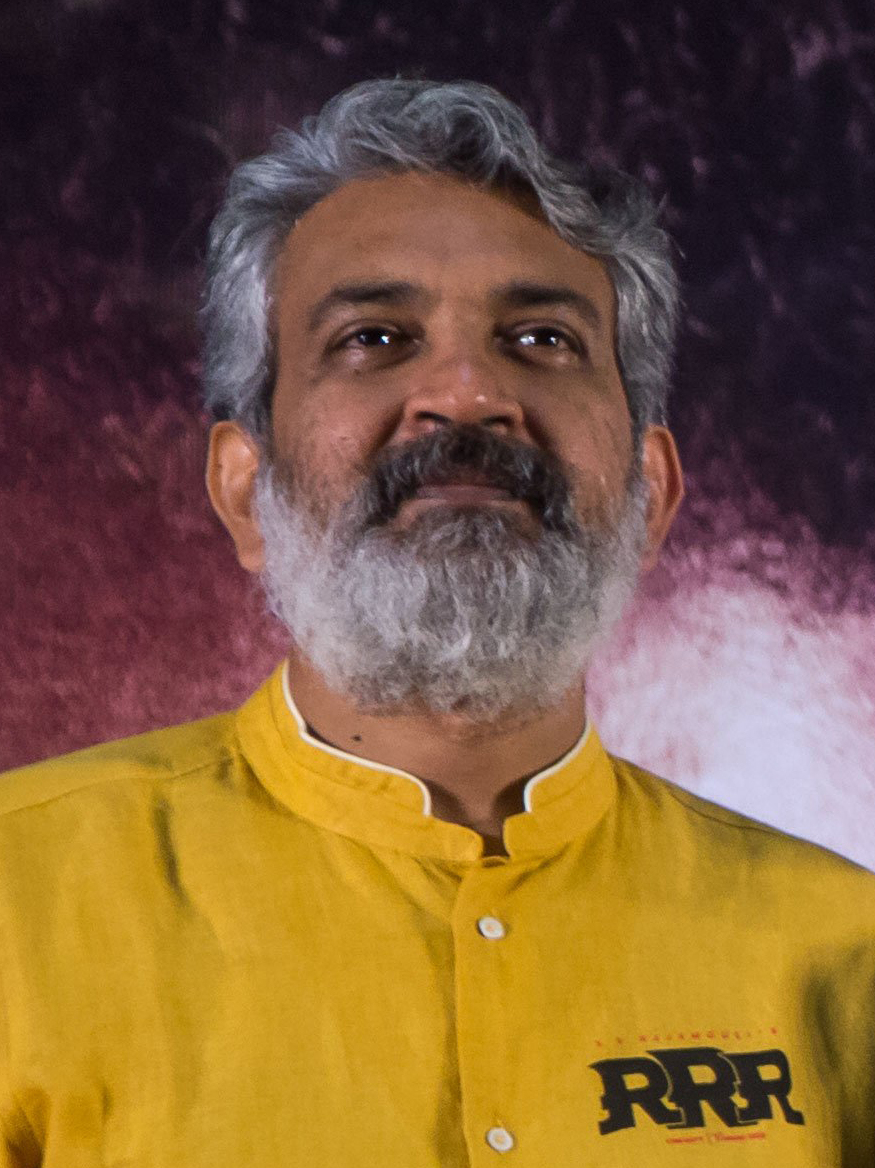
S. S. Rajamouli, Best Director winner

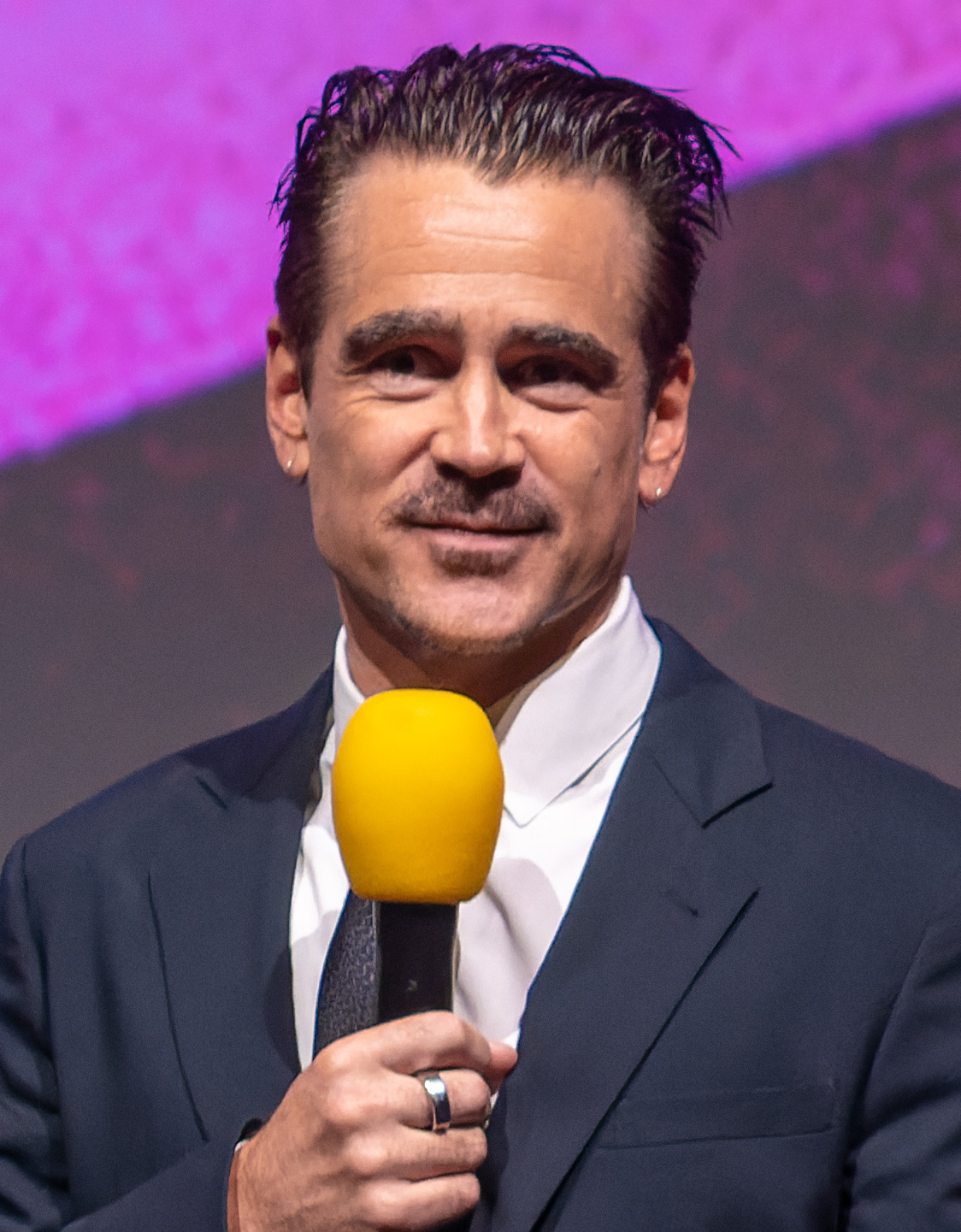
Colin Farrell, Best Actor winner

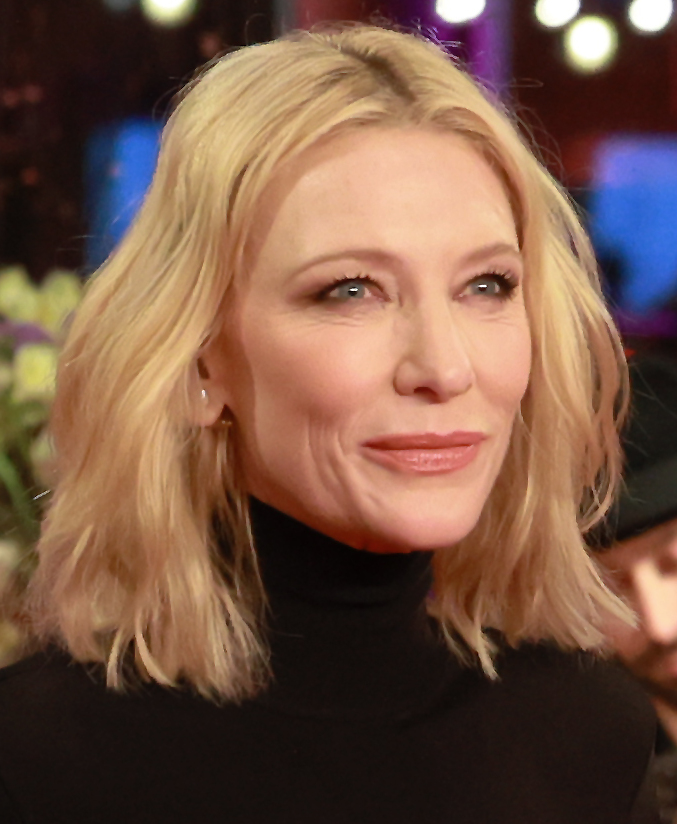
Cate Blanchett, Best Actress winner

- Best Film:
  - Tár
- Best Director:
  - S. S. Rajamouli – RRR
- Best Actor:
  - Colin Farrell – The Banshees of Inisherin / After Yang
- Best Actress:
  - Cate Blanchett – Tár
- Best Supporting Actor:
  - Ke Huy Quan – Everything Everywhere All at Once
- Best Supporting Actress:
  - Keke Palmer – Nope
- Best Screenplay:
  - Martin McDonagh – The Banshees of Inisherin
- Best Animated Film:
  - Marcel the Shell with Shoes On
- Best Cinematography:
  - Claudio Miranda – Top Gun: Maverick
- Best Non-Fiction Film:
  - All the Beauty and the Bloodshed
- Best International Film:
  - EO • Poland
- Best First Film:
  - Aftersun
- Special Awards:
  - Jafar Panahi, "for his dogged bravery as an artist, and for the humanity and beauty of a body of work created under the most oppressive circumstances".
  - Jake Perlin (curator, distributor, and publisher), "in recognition of his indispensable contributions to film culture".
  - dGenerate Films, "for their invaluable work bringing independent films from China to a wider audience".
- Special Mentions:
  - Cash prizes were awarded to two students focusing on film criticism/journalism attending college in the region:
    - Undergraduate – Nico Pedrero-Setzer
    - Graduate – Greg Nussen
