= Tár =

2022 film by Todd Field

- Theatrical release poster
- Directed by: Todd Field
- Written by: Todd Field
- Produced by: Todd Field; Alexandra Milchan; Scott Lambert
- Starring: Cate Blanchett; Noémie Merlant; Nina Hoss; Sophie Kauer; Julian Glover; Allan Corduner; Mark Strong
- Cinematography: Florian Hoffmeister
- Edited by: Monika Willi
- Music by: Hildur Guðnadóttir
- Production companies: Standard Film Company; EMJAG Productions
- Distributed by: Focus Features (United States); Universal Pictures (international)
- Release dates: September 1, 2022 (Venice); October 7, 2022 (United States); March 2, 2023 (Germany)
- Running time: 158 minutes
- Countries: United States; Germany
- Language: English
- Box office: $29.3 million

Tár is a 2022 psychological drama film written and directed by Todd Field. Cate Blanchett stars as Lydia Tár, a world-renowned conductor, whose life unravels after she is accused of misconduct. The supporting cast includes Nina Hoss, Noémie Merlant, Sophie Kauer, Julian Glover, Allan Corduner, and Mark Strong.

Tár premiered at the 79th Venice International Film Festival in September 2022, where Blanchett won the Volpi Cup for Best Actress. Following a three-week limited theatrical release, it received a wide release on October 28, 2022, through Focus Features. It received acclaim, especially for Blanchett's performance and Field's screenplay and direction. At the 95th Academy Awards, it garnered six nominations, including Best Picture, Best Original Screenplay and Best Director for Field, and Best Actress for Blanchett.

Tár is the fourth film in history to be named Best Film of the Year by the New York Film Critics Circle, the Los Angeles Film Critics Association, the London Film Critics' Circle and the National Society of Film Critics. It has appeared in numerous lists of the greatest films of the 21st century.

== Plot ==
While being interviewed by Adam Gopnik at The New Yorker Festival, Lydia Tár, chief conductor of a Berlin orchestra, promotes her upcoming live recording of Mahler's Fifth Symphony and memoir Tár on Tár. She then meets with Eliot Kaplan, an investment banker and amateur conductor who co-founded the Accordion Foundation with Lydia to support aspiring female conductors. They discuss technique, replacing Lydia's assistant conductor Sebastian with her personal assistant and confidante Francesca, and filling a vacant cello position in Berlin.

As a guest lecturer, Lydia holds a masterclass at Juilliard. When a student expresses reluctance to study Bach due to his social views, she encourages them to focus on composers' music rather than their personal lives. The student leaves, exasperated. That night, Lydia anonymously receives a first edition of Vita Sackville-West's novel Challenge. She tears up and discards the title page, which is embellished with a hand-drawn kené pattern, a reminder of her trip to Peru.

Lydia returns to Berlin, where she lives with her wife Sharon, the concertmaster of the orchestra, and their daughter Petra. Before a blind audition for the cello position, Lydia meets young Russian candidate Olga Metkina. Lydia changes her scorecard to ensure Olga a spot in the orchestra and proposes Elgar's Cello Concerto as the companion piece to the Mahler symphony, guaranteeing Olga the soloist position. Lydia's attraction to Olga strains her relationships with Francesca and Sharon.

Lydia's former mentee Krista Taylor, who was blacklisted after a dispute with Lydia, sends disturbing emails to Francesca before committing suicide. Lydia has Francesca delete the emails and hire a lawyer after discovering that Krista's parents plan to sue her. Lydia informs Sebastian of his imminent replacement. Incensed, he chastises her for her inappropriate favoritism; Lydia thusly decides against promoting Francesca.

Lydia is afflicted by increasing sound sensitivity, surreal nightmares, daytime hallucinations, chronic pain, and enigmatic patterned scribbles resembling those Krista once made. While composing a piece dedicated to Petra, she is disturbed by the sound of her dying next door neighbor's medical device. One day, Lydia falls and hurts herself while following Olga home, but tells Sharon she was injured in a mugging.

A manipulatively edited video of Lydia's Juilliard class goes viral, an article accusing her of sexual predation appears in the New York Post, and her Wikipedia article is edited to include the controversial new information about her. Lydia tries contacting Francesca, who resigned after being denied the promotion. She breaks into Francesca's home and finds a draft of Tár on Tár, which Francesca has renamed Rat on Rat. Lydia, accompanied by Olga, returns to New York to attend a deposition for Krista's parents' lawsuit and promote her book. The two are met by protestors, and Lydia is confronted with incriminating emails between her and Krista, provided by Francesca.

In Berlin, Lydia is removed as conductor due to the controversy. Furious over the allegations and Lydia's lack of transparency, Sharon bars her from seeing Petra. An increasingly depressed and deranged Lydia retreats to her old studio. She sneaks into the live recording she was supposed to conduct and rushes the stage to assault Eliot, who replaced her as conductor. Advised to remain out of the public eye by her management, she returns to her modest childhood home on Staten Island, where she finds certificates of achievement bearing her birth name, Linda Tarr. She cries watching an old VHS of Young People's Concerts in which Leonard Bernstein discusses the meaning of music. Her brother Tony arrives and admonishes her for forgetting her roots.

Some time later, Lydia finds work conducting in the Philippines. She asks the concierge at her hotel for a recommendation for a massage, but he sends her to a brothel fronting as a massage parlor. The young women at the brothel sit in a semicircle with numbers on their robes; number 5 looks directly at Lydia, who runs outside to vomit. Later, she conducts a live performance of the score for the video game series Monster Hunter in front of an audience of cosplayers.

== Cast ==
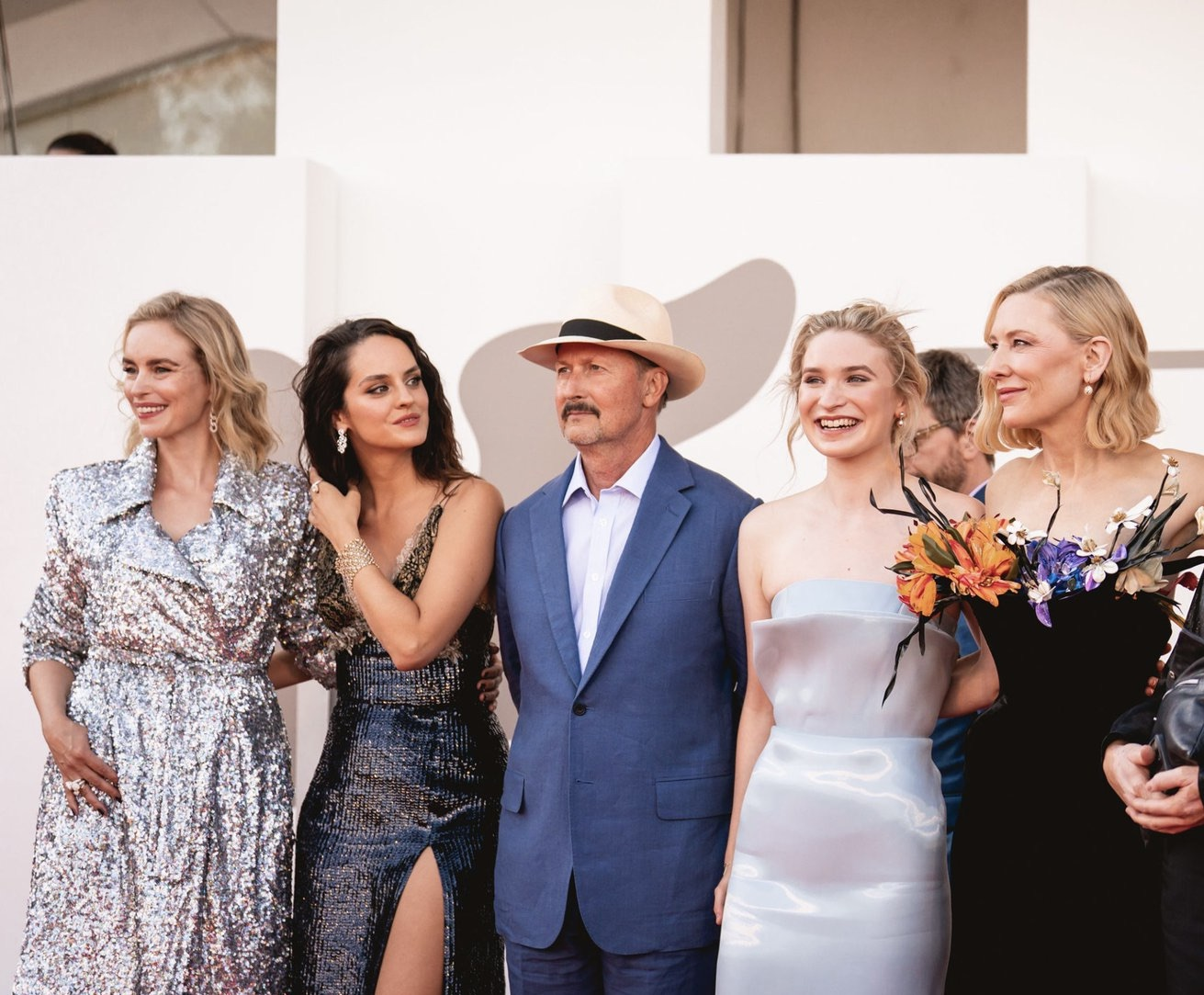
Nina Hoss, Noémie Merlant, Todd Field, Sophie Kauer & Cate Blanchett at the 79th Venice Biennale

- Cate Blanchett as Lydia Tár, a world-famous composer–conductor
- Noémie Merlant as Francesca Lentini, Lydia's assistant
- Nina Hoss as Sharon Goodnow, a concertmaster and Lydia's wife
- Sophie Kauer as Olga Metkina, a young Russian cellist
- Julian Glover as Andris Davis, Lydia's predecessor
- Allan Corduner as Sebastian Brix, Lydia's assistant conductor
- Mark Strong as Eliot Kaplan, an investment banker, amateur conductor, and manager of Lydia's fellowship program
- Adam Gopnik as himself, Lydia's interviewer at The New Yorker Festival
- Sylvia Flote as Krista Taylor, a former member of Lydia's fellowship program
- Sydney Lemmon as Whitney Reese, a fan of Lydia
- Zethphan Smith-Gneist as Max, a Juilliard student
- Alec Baldwin (voice only) as himself, interviewing Lydia on his podcast Here's the Thing
- Mila Bogojevic as Petra, Lydia and Sharon's daughter
- Lee Sellars as Tony, Lydia's brother

== Production ==
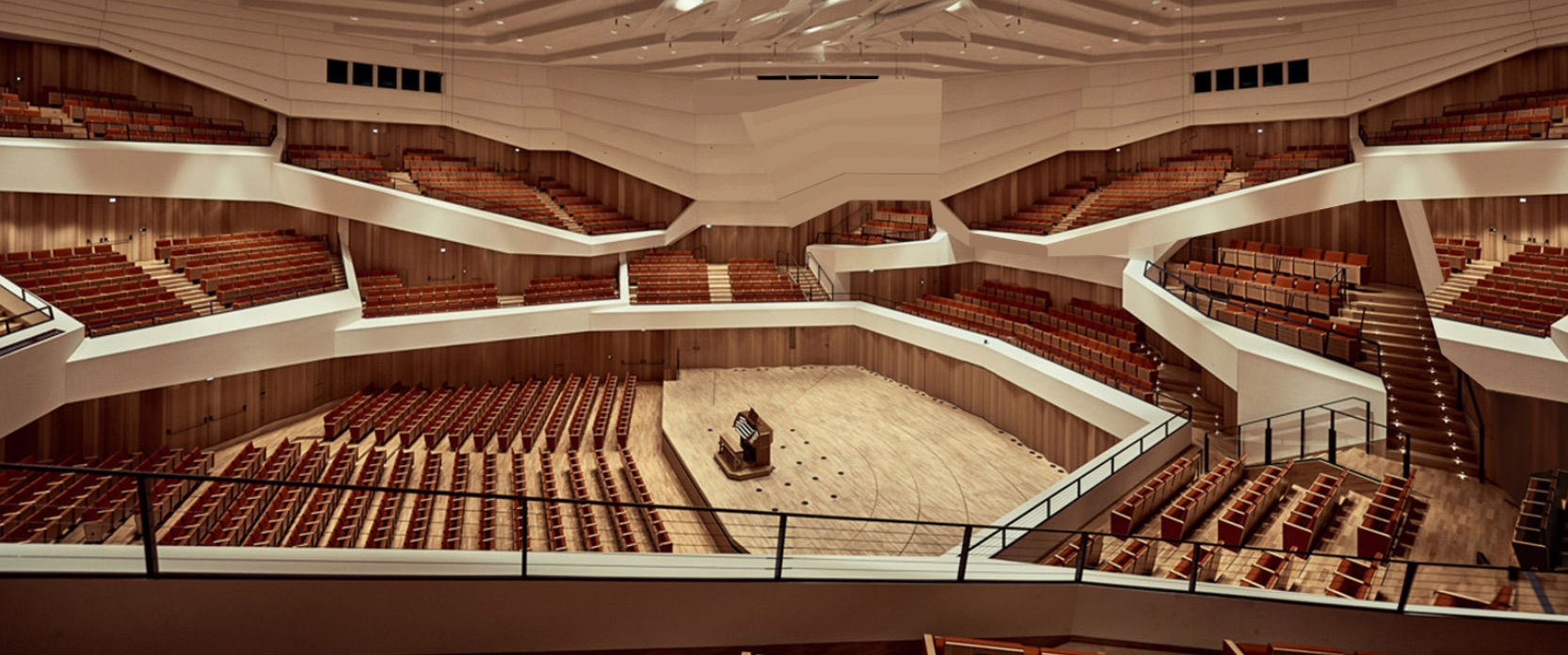
The Dresden Philharmonic was used as a stand-in for the Berlin Philharmonic.

It was announced in April 2021 that Blanchett would star in the film, which would be written and directed by Todd Field, with production set to begin in September 2021. In a statement accompanying the teaser trailer in August 2022, Field said that he wrote the script for Blanchett, and that he would not have made the film if she had declined it. In September 2021, Nina Hoss and Noémie Merlant joined the cast, and Hildur Guðnadóttir became the film's composer.

In an interview with The Guardian in October, Mark Strong revealed that he had finished filming scenes for the film. In November, it was reported that filming was taking place in Berlin, with Sophie Kauer, Julian Glover, Allan Corduner and Sylvia Flote joining the cast. (Kauer is a British-German classical cellist who studied at the Royal Academy of Music.) All diegetic music was recorded live on-set, including Blanchett's piano playing, Kauer's cello, and the Dresden Philharmonic's performances.

=== Music ===
The conductor John Mauceri was as a consultant on Field's script, helping inform the tenor and accuracy of Lydia Tár's comments on classical music and musicians. Hildur Guðnadóttir composed the original score, although other music was also included, including classical music by Gustav Mahler and Edward Elgar. Over 30 tracks are featured.

A concept album featuring 20 tracks, titled Tár (Music from and Inspired By the Motion Picture) was released on October 21, 2022. It includes Guðnadóttir's score with the London Contemporary Orchestra, and a rehearsal of Mahler's Fifth Symphony with Blanchett conducting the Dresden Philharmonic, as well as new music by Guðnadóttir.

For the week ending November 5, 2022, the Tár concept album topped Billboard magazine's Traditional Classical Albums chart at number one. In December 2022, Guðnadóttir's score was ruled ineligible for Oscar consideration, as there was not enough original, audible music, and also because it did not fulfill the rule that "a score shall not be eligible if it has been diluted by the use of pre-existing music".

== Release ==
Tár had its world premiere at the 79th Venice International Film Festival on September 1, 2022, and had its first North American screening at the 49th Telluride Film Festival on September 3, 2022. It had a limited theatrical release on October 7, 2022, then expanded to wide release on October 28.

The film was released for VOD on November 15, 2022, followed by a Blu-ray, DVD, and 4K UHD release on December 20. By March 9, 2023, according to Samba TV, the film had been streamed on Peacock in 458,000 households in the US since the Oscar nomination announcement on January 24. JustWatch also reported it to be, by February 21, the third most-streamed Best Picture nominee in Canada. In the UK, BBC 2 broadcast Tár nationwide on the 14 September 2025, with a reduced running time of 150 minutes.

== Reception ==
=== Box office ===
Tár grossed $6.8 million in the United States and Canada, and $22.4 million in other territories, for a worldwide total of $29.2 million. In the United States and Canada, it made $158,620 from four theaters in its opening weekend. The $39,655 per-screen average was the second highest of 2022 for a limited release. In its second weekend the film made $330,030 from 36 theaters. In its third weekend it made $500,035 from 141 theaters, and there was speculation in the trades that Tár was an example that there was still a place for "adult-minded fare". However, once Tár expanded to 1,087 theaters in its fourth weekend, leaving the limited specialty house run for the multiplex, it made only $1.02 million, finishing 10th. Audiences surveyed by PostTrak over the weekend gave the film a 72% positive score, with 42% saying they would definitely recommend it. In its second week of wide release, it made $729,605 (marking a drop of 30%).

Some commentators attributed the poor US domestic box office performance to the film's subject matter alienating a general audience. Others noted a larger trend in US art houses, 40% of which had permanently shuttered during the COVID-19 pandemic, struggling to regain their core 40–70-year-old audience, an audience more prone to health concerns and still hesitant to return to the cinema. The New York Times reported that Tár "cost at least $35 million including marketing" and that it and similar highbrow films from established filmmakers such as Paul Thomas Anderson's Licorice Pizza, Guillermo del Toro's Nightmare Alley, and Steven Spielberg's The Fabelmans had "failed to find an audience big enough to justify their costs". 78% of the film's box office takings were overseas.

=== Critical response ===
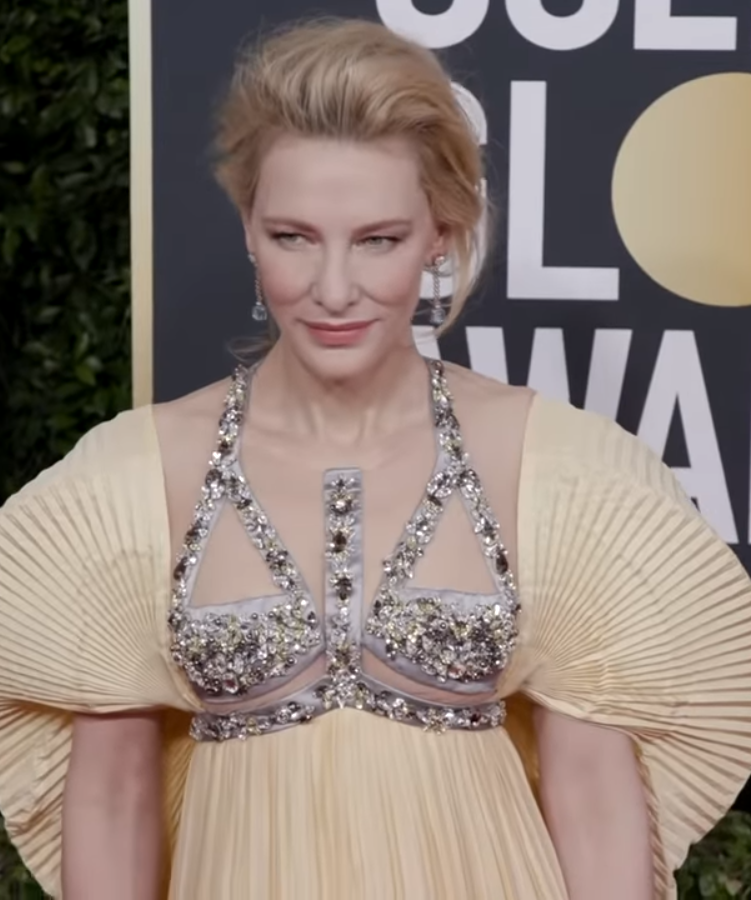
Blanchett garnered critical acclaim for her performance and was nominated for the Academy Award for Best Actress

On Rotten Tomatoes, 91% of 361 critics' reviews are positive. The website's consensus reads, "Led by the soaring melody of Cate Blanchett's note-perfect performance, Tár riffs brilliantly on the discordant side of fame-fueled power." Metacritic, which uses a weighted average, assigned the film a score of 93 out of 100, based on 60 critics, indicating "universal acclaim".

Owen Gleiberman in his Venice Film Festival Daily Variety review wrote:

Let me say right up front: It's the work of a master filmmaker ... Field's script is dazzling in its conversational flow, its insider dexterity, its perception of how power in the world actually works ... Tár is not a judgement so much as a statement you can make your own judgment about. The statement is: We're in a new world.

A. O. Scott of The New York Times writing from the Telluride Film Festival and later from the New York Film Festival stated:

I'm not sure I've ever seen a movie quite like Tár. Field balances Apollonian restraint with Dionysian frenzy. Tár is meticulously controlled and also scarily wild. Field finds a new way of posing the perennial question about separating the artist from the art, a question that he suggests can only be answered by another question: are you crazy? We don't care about Tár because she's an artist. We care about her because she's art.

Justin Chang for the Los Angeles Times regarded the film as:

"Both a superb character study and a highly persuasive piece of world building", stating that the director's "storytelling draws no artificial distinction between the big and the small, the important and the mundane; everything we see and hear matters. Tár is irreducible, and it is great."

Alissa Wilkinson, writing for Vox, observed:

"Not to be hyperbolic, but it might be perfect. Todd Field has tuned his themes so brilliantly. You can't just half-watch Tár, it demands your full attention. That's the mark of good art, but it's a discipline so many contemporary films aren't willing to demand from audiences. And if you're honest with yourself, you don't just watch Tár; it watches you, too."

Reviewing the film for The Hollywood Reporter, David Rooney wrote:

Tár marks yet another career peak for Blanchett—many are likely to argue her greatest—and a fervent reason to hope it's not sixteen more years before Field gives us another feature. It's a work of genius.

Anthony Lane of The New Yorker stated:

To what extent she is a proven predator; how much she deserves to be preyed upon, in turn, by the gluttons of public indignation; and why, despite everything, she should enjoy our lingering sympathy in a way that a middle-aged man in her position would not: such issues will, no doubt, be aired and contested in due course. Field is wise enough to reserve judgment. It would be dead wrong, though, to consider Tár as a kind of op-ed made flesh.

Lane's colleague Richard Brody disagreed and argued in his capsule review that Tár was: "a regressive film that takes bitter aim at so-called cancel culture and lampoons so-called identity politics". Brody laments Field's "absence of style" in filming the music and he accuses the film of "conservative button-pushing" with a narrow aesthetic, failing to achieve dramatic unity.

=== Additional reactions ===
Martin Scorsese presenting Field with the 2022 New York Film Critics Circle Awards Best Film of the Year, said,

For so long now, so many of us see films that pretty much let us know where they're going ... I mean, they take us by the hand and, even if it's disturbing at times, sort of comfort us along the way that it will be all okay by the end. Now this is insidious, as one can get lulled into this and ultimately get used to it, leading those of us who've experienced cinema in the past – as much more than that – to become despairing of the future of the art form, especially for younger generations. But that's on dark days. The clouds lifted when I experienced Todd's film, Tár. What you've done, Todd – is that the very fabric of the movie you created doesn't allow this. All the aspects of cinema and the film that you've used, attest to this ... conveyed through a masterful mise-en-scène, as controlled, precise, dangerous, precipitous angles and edges geometrically kind of chiseled into wonderful frame compositions. The limits of the frame itself, and the provocation of measured long takes all reflecting the brutal architecture of her soul – Tár's soul.

Paul Thomas Anderson presenting Field with the Director Medallion at the 75th annual DGA Awards said,

Every detail matters in this film. Nothing is not deliberate or full of intention. It's directed with such perfectly controlled mayhem and glee by Todd, it's really hard not to drool as another director. He made a film which for some years was considered a very dirty word, he made an art film. But it's art that's not fussy or pretentious. Just razor-sharp, pitch black, and hilarious. A very focused mirror held up to some of the worst of our human behaviors. It's also a blast.

In an interview with The Sunday Times, conductor Marin Alsop shared her dislike of the film, calling it "anti-woman", saying "I was offended: I was offended as a woman, I was offended as a conductor, I was offended as a lesbian. To have an opportunity to portray a woman in that role and to make her an abuser – for me that was heartbreaking." However The Times own film critic, Kevin Maher, responded to Alsop's statement by pointing out that Tár is a work of fiction and that the viewer is left to reflect on the character's ambiguity The Guardian's Xan Brooks wrote that "this question of likability, specifically female likability, is clearly a vexed one". Blanchett herself told BBC Radio 4 that the film was a "meditation on power, and power is genderless", and that while her character shares similarities with Alsop, it is a complete work of fiction.

Conductor Alice Farnham thanked Blanchett, Field and the film in The Guardian, for "taking up the baton for female conductors", and for normalising their image. Critic Emily Bootle also defended the film in The i Paper writing: "This is a film about power [but] sometimes we have to tolerate grey areas." Film critics Mark Kermode and Simon Mayo also disagreed with the interpretation that Tár is "anti-woman".

In an essay for The New Yorker Tavi Gevinson wrote "By creating a character who can't be written off as another predictably problematic man, Tár draws our attention to how Lydia learned to become one... In lieu of asking 'Can you separate the art from the artist?' or 'But what will happen to these poor, bad men?', Tár asks, 'What does power look like, feel like, not only within an institution but within an individual psyche?'"

Writing for Time, Stephanie Zacharek went further: "Tár doesn't offer anything as comfortable as redemption, and it asks us to fall in love, at least a little, with a tyrant. ... Lydia Tár ... knows that the power of a question is greater than that of a slogan."

Music professor Ian Pace discussed the issue in The Conversation: "It would be rash to assume that such a figure could never act in a predatory and exploitative manner. This is not just an issue of identity, but power and the opportunities it provides for the reckless." Conductor Don Baton (a pen name) in City Journal agreed.

Film critic John McDonald for the Australian Financial Review wrote: "Had it been a male conductor, the story would have been a cliché. Had it been a celebration of female power, it would have been no less superficial ... Field has taken the 'Maestro myth' that portrays the conductor as a kind of hypermale and shown that the same issues may apply to a woman." Several other conductors and musicians wrote in defense of the film.

Yo-Yo Ma told IndieWire "Todd has created such a striking film. Cate Blanchett's Lydia Tár demands that we wrestle with two of art's most difficult questions: what gives art its power and what role does power play in art?"

In a public talk, Gustavo Dudamel complimented both Field and Blanchett stating that their world-building of the milieu was both "credible and natural".

Jonathan Franzen praised the film in Daily Variety saying, "Todd's grammar of screenwriting is closer to a novel's than to a play's. What makes Tár a great work of art is that there's not a single generic moment to be found in it."

Zadie Smith, in an essay for The New York Review of Books, commended Cate Blanchett's performance and praised Field's direction as "worthy of Kubrick". The classroom scene at the Juilliard School was described by A. O. Scott as "a mini-course in the dos and don'ts of contemporary pedagogy".

Critic Amanda Hess wrote in The New York Times, "The online cancellation of an artistic giant can be a tedious subject, but in Tár, it acquires sneaky complications ... Tár offers up a work into which we can sublimate our own Schadenfreude and sympathy for abusers. Thanks to Blanchett's luminous performance and Field's puzzle-box storytelling, we are freed to obsess."

Film critic Howie Movshovitz (KUNC), critic and essayist Philippa Snow (ArtReview), and Guillaume Orignac (Cahiers du Cinéma) drew attention to the film's creative open-endedness, allowing audiences to draw their own conclusions about its significance and meaning, with Murielle Joudet (Le Monde) choosing it as her favorite film of 2023 writing, "This year, it was a rare pleasure to leave the cinema, having suddenly forgotten to judge a character who was most certainly guilty. Field walks a tightrope while managing to remain invisible. Tár is a masterpiece. It poetically captures the spirit of our time and draws from it a new way of storytelling. Above all, it leaves viewers alone, free to make their own opinions and to lose their bearings without knowing what the next scene will be. This type of wandering is a gift that has become too rare in cinema."

The New York Times columnist Michelle Goldberg argued that Tár is "a film about cancel culture, making it the rare piece of art that looks squarely at this social phenomenon that has roiled so many of America's meaning-making institutions ... Tár demonstrates that all this flux and uncertainty is very fertile territory for art. Hopefully its success – many are predicting it will win a Best Picture Oscar – will encourage others to take on similarly thorny and unsettled issues. Hysteria about cancel culture can encourage artistic timidity by overstating the cost of probing taboos. In truth, there's a hunger out there for work that takes the strangeness of this time and turns it into something that transcends polemic."

Austrian musicologist and anthropologist Bernd Brabec alleged that part of Lydia Tár's biography read aloud by Adam Gopnik mines his CV. In response, Brabec wrote an open letter to director Todd Field. In the letter, Brabec takes offence at the film mirroring particulars of his academic background and criticizes what he characterized as unfortunately minimal and shallow treatment of the Shipibo-Konibo people in the plot of the film. However, Amanda M. Smith, associate professor of Latin American and Culture at the University of California wrote in ReVista, the Harvard Review of Latin America, "Shipibo-Konibo cosmovision is not merely decorative in the film. It organizes the narrative's internal conflicts and reveals Tár as a tale of shamanic justice in a world where the Global North continues to take from the Global South."

Writing in Artforum in October 2022, Amy Taubin's criticized the film's final scene in an unnmed Southeast Asian country as "carelessly racist". In an article on female predators in recent cinema in the same publication in May 2024, Ara Osterweill defends the point of the film's ending.

Because the film was released in the United Kingdom in January 2023, Tár was included in Sight and Sound's Best Films of 2023, and sat atop the polls of New Statesman and Time Out, with Phil de Semlyen of Time Out writing "Blanchett's Oscar-nominated performance has rightly earned the lion's share of plaudits, but the superb acting is buoyed by Field's subtly off-kilter visual style, lending the 'ripped from the headlines' narrative a hint of Kubrickian uncanniness." The Guardian also chose Tár as best film of the year, with critic Wendy Ide writing, "Todd Field's creation of the magnificent, monstrous fictional conductor Lydia Tár, inhabited down to the last shred of cruelty and ambition by the remarkable Cate Blanchett, is exceptional: a savage, slippery account of rampant narcissism brought down to earth." In April 2024 the historian Simon Heffer wrote in The Sunday Telegraph that Tár is "the finest American film of the century".

=== Retrospective lists ===
In 2024, IndieWire listed Tár, and In the Bedroom, also directed by Field, as "Best Picture Nominees that Deserved to win the Oscar", stating, "Todd Field's portrait of the talent and ego of a world-renowned conductor is some of the most riveting and ambitious filmmaking in recent memory. Tár feels like a movie people will be talking about and debating long after the ceremony where it lost fades from memory."

In 2025, IndieWire ranked the film at number 4 on its list of "The 100 Best Movies of the 2020s (So Far)". That same year it sat at number 67 on The New York Times' list of "The 100 Best Movies of the 21st Century" and number 68 on the "Readers' Choice" edition. Rolling Stone ranked it 43 on their list of "The 100 Best Movies of the 21st Century".

In 2026, New York magazine listed Tár alongside Citizen Kane, Sunset Boulevard, Dr. Strangelove, Butch Cassidy and the Sundance Kid, The Conversation, Nashville, Taxi Driver, The Elephant Man, Pulp Fiction, There Will Be Blood, Roma, and In the Bedroom, also directed by Field, as "The Best Movies That Lost Best Picture at the Oscars". It ranked 6 on The Times' list of "The 25 Best Films of the Decade". And 43 on the Daily Telegraph's "50 Greatest Films of All Time".

=== Accolades ===
Among other accolades, Tár received Academy Award nominations in six categories: Best Picture, Best Director, Best Actress for Blanchett, Best Original Screenplay, Best Cinematography, and Best Film Editing.

== See also ==
- List of LGBTQ Academy Award winners and nominees § Performances of LGBTQ Characters Nominated for or Awarded Best Actress in a Leading Role
